= Australia in World War I =

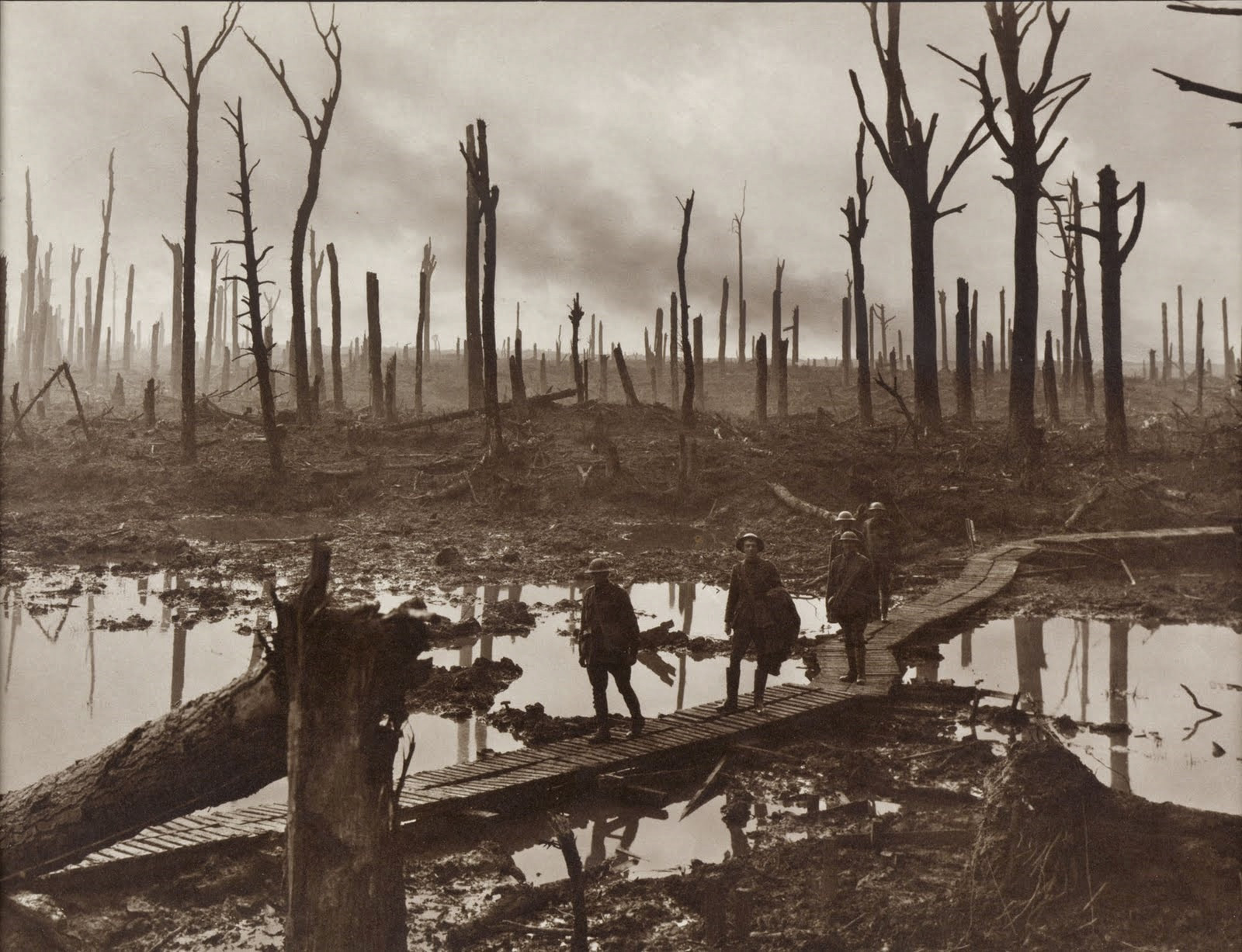
Soldiers from the 4th Division near Chateau Wood, Ypres, in 1917

In Australia, the outbreak of World War I was greeted with considerable enthusiasm. Even before Britain declared war on Germany on 4 August 1914, the nation pledged its support alongside other states of the British Empire and almost immediately began preparations to send forces overseas to engage in the conflict. The first campaign that Australians were involved in was in German New Guinea after a hastily raised force known as the Australian Naval and Military Expeditionary Force was dispatched in September 1914 from Australia and seized and held German possessions in the Pacific. At the same time another expeditionary force, initially consisting of 20,000 men and known as the Australian Imperial Force (AIF), was raised for service overseas.

The AIF departed Australia in November 1914 and, after several delays due to the presence of German naval vessels in the Indian Ocean, arrived in Egypt, where they were initially used to defend the Suez Canal. In early 1915, it was decided to carry out an amphibious landing on the Gallipoli peninsula with the goal of opening up a second front and securing the passage of the Dardanelles. The Australians and New Zealanders, grouped together as the Australian and New Zealand Army Corps (ANZAC), went ashore on 25 April 1915 and for the next eight months the Anzacs, alongside their British, French and other allies, fought a costly and ultimately unsuccessful campaign against the Turks.

The force was evacuated from the peninsula in December 1915 and returned to Egypt, where the AIF was expanded. In early 1916 it was decided that the infantry divisions would be sent to France, where they took part in many of the major battles fought on the Western Front. Most of the light horse units remained in the Middle East until the end of the war, carrying out further operations against the Turks in Egypt and Palestine. Small numbers of Australians served in other theatres of war. Although the main focus of the Australian military's effort was the ground war, air and naval forces were also committed. Squadrons of the Australian Flying Corps served in the Middle East and on the Western Front, and elements of the Royal Australian Navy carried out operations in the Atlantic, North Sea, Adriatic and Black Sea, as well as the Pacific and Indian Oceans.

By the end of the war, Australians were far more circumspect. The nation's involvement cost more than 60,000 Australian lives and many more were left unable to work as a result of their injuries. The impact of the war was felt in many other areas as well. Financially it was very costly. The effect on the social and political landscape was considerable and threatened to cause serious divides in the nation's social fabric. Conscription was possibly the most contentious issue and ultimately, despite having conscription for home service, Australia was one of only three combatants not to use conscripts in the fighting, the others being India (though many volunteers were pressured into enlisting) and Siam. For many Australians the nation's involvement in World War I and the Gallipoli campaign was seen as a symbol of its emergence as an international actor; many of the notions of the Australian character and nationhood that exist today have their origins in the war, and Anzac Day is commemorated as a national holiday.

== Outbreak of the war ==
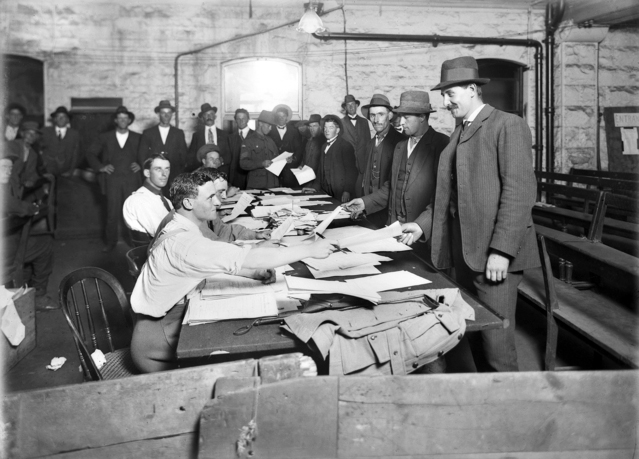
Men in Melbourne collecting recruitment papers

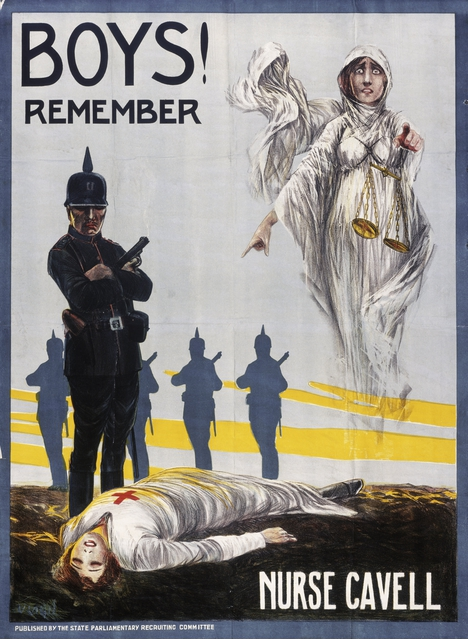
Australian government recruiting poster 1915 (using Edith Cavell's "martyrdom")

On 30 July 1914, the British government informed the Australian government via an encoded telegram that a declaration of war was likely. The message came during the lead-up to the 1914 federal election, meaning parliament was not in session and key political figures were spread around the country campaigning. Prime Minister Joseph Cook spoke at Horsham, Victoria, on 31 July, telling an election meeting to "remember that when the Empire is at war, so is Australia at war [...] all our resources in Australia are in the Empire and for the Empire and for the preservation and security of the Empire". On the same day, Opposition Leader Andrew Fisher was speaking at Colac, Victoria, and promised that "Australians will stand beside our own to help and defend her to our last man and our last shilling". An emergency cabinet meeting – at which only five out of ten ministers were present – was convened in Melbourne on 3 August, the government deciding that it would offer to send an expeditionary force of 20,000 men. The United Kingdom declared war on 4 August at 11 p.m. (5 August at 9 a.m. Melbourne time), and Australia and the other Dominions were considered to be "automatically" at war as well. At 12:45 p.m. on 5 August, Cook announced to the press in his office that "I have received the following despatch from the Imperial government: 'war has broken out in Germany'". Given the predominantly British heritage of most Australians at the time, there was considerable support from all corners of the country and large numbers of young Australian men reported to recruiting centres around the country to enlist in the following months.

Within days, plans for an Australian expeditionary force were completed by Brigadier General William Throsby Bridges and his staff officer, Major Cyril Brudenell Bingham White. White proposed a force of 18,000 men (12,000 Australians and 6,000 New Zealanders). This proposal was approved by Prime Minister Cook but he increased the offer to the British of 20,000 men to serve in any destination desired by the Home Government. On 6 August 1914, London cabled its acceptance of the force and asked that it be sent as soon as possible. Recruiting offices opened on 10 August 1914 and by the end of 1914, 52,561 volunteers had been accepted, although strict physical fitness guidelines were put in place.

== German New Guinea ==
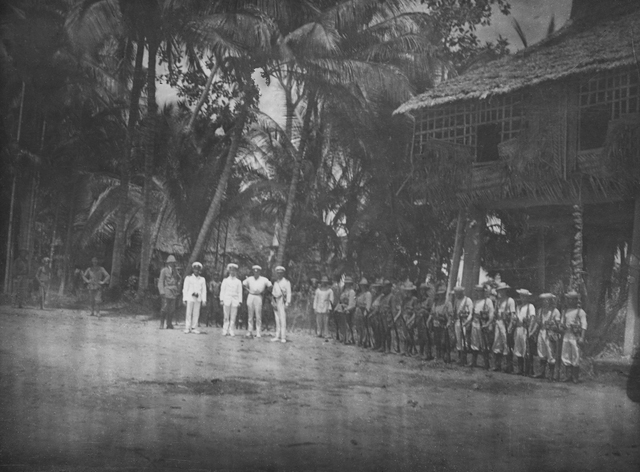
The raising of the Australian flag on 16 December 1914 in Angorum, New Guinea

In 1884, Germany had colonised the north eastern part of New Guinea and several nearby island groups. By the outbreak of the war, the Germans had been using the colony as a wireless radio base, and supporting the German East Asia Squadron which threatened merchant shipping in the region. As a consequence, Britain required the wireless installations to be destroyed. Shortly after the outbreak of war—following a request by the British government on 6 August 1914—the Australian Naval and Military Expeditionary Force (AN&MEF) began forming. The objectives of the force were the German stations at Yap in the Caroline Islands, Nauru and at Rabaul, New Britain. The AN&MEF comprised one battalion of infantry (1,023 men) enlisted in Sydney, 500 naval reservists and ex-sailors organised into six companies who would serve as infantry and a further 500 men from the Kennedy Regiment, a Queensland militia battalion that had volunteered for overseas service and had been sent to garrison Thursday Island. Together, these forces were placed under the command of Colonel William Holmes, an officer in the militia who was at the time commander of the 6th Brigade and secretary of the Sydney Water and Sewerage Board.

The task force sailed from Sydney on 19 August 1914, and hove to off Port Moresby where they waited for their escorts to arrive. While they were at Port Moresby, Holmes decided to disembark the Queensland militia soldiers due to concerns about their preparedness for action. Escorted by the cruiser Sydney and the battlecruiser Australia, the task force reached Rabaul on 11 September 1914 and found that the port was free of German forces. Sydney and the destroyer HMAS Warrego landed small parties of naval reservists at the settlements of Kabakaul and the German gubernatorial capital Herbertshöhe on Neu-Pommern, south-east of Rabaul. These parties were reinforced first by sailors from HMAS Warrego and HMAS Yarra and later by infantry from the transport HMAS Berrima.

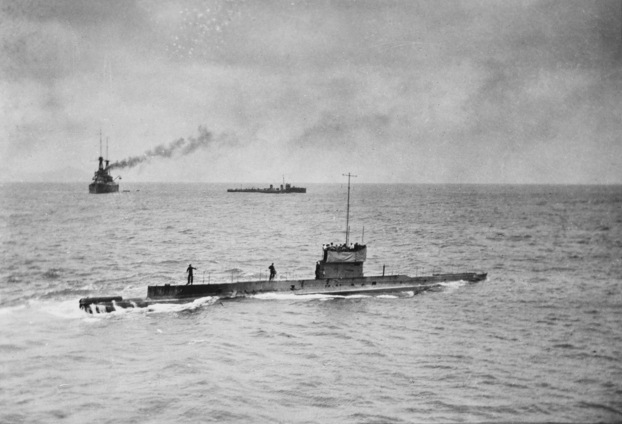
The submarine AE1 with other Australian ships off Rossel Island on 9 September 1914. On 14 September it inexplicably disappeared during a patrol off Rabaul.

A small 25-man force of naval reservists was subsequently landed at Kabakaul Bay and continued inland to capture the radio station believed to be in operation at Bita Paka, 4 miles (7 km) to the south. The Australians were resisted by a mixed force of German reservists and Melanesian native police, who forced them to fight their way to the radio station. By nightfall, the radio station was reached and it was found to have been abandoned, the mast dropped but its instruments and machinery intact. During the Battle of Bita Paka six Australians were killed and five wounded; the defenders lost one German non-commissioned officer (NCO) and about 30 Melanesians killed, and one German and ten Melanesians wounded. Later it was alleged that the heavy losses among the Melanesian troops was the result of the Australians bayoneting all those they had captured during the fighting. As a result of this engagement, Able Seaman W.G.V. Williams became the first Australian fatality of the war. The first Army fatality was a medical officer, Captain B. C. A. Pockley, who died the same day.

At nightfall on 12 September, the Berrima landed the AN&MEF infantry battalion at Rabaul. The following afternoon, although the governor had not yet surrendered the territory, a ceremony was carried out to signal the British occupation of New Britain. The German administration had withdrawn inland to Toma at dawn on 14 September, and HMAS Encounter subsequently bombarded a ridge near the town while half a battalion advanced towards the town supported by a field gun. The show of firepower was sufficient to start negotiations, ending the siege of Toma following the surrender of the remaining garrison of 40 Germans and 110 native police. The German territory surrendered on 17 September 1914.

Although successful the operation was arguably not well managed, and the Australians had been effectively delayed by a half-trained native force. The Australians had prevailed not least of all because of their unexpected ability to fight in close terrain, and outflanking the German positions had unnerved their opponents. The losses of the AN&MEF were light in the context of later operations but were sufficiently heavy given the relatively modest gain. These losses were further compounded by the unexplained disappearance of the Australian submarine HMAS AE1 during a patrol off Rabaul on 14 September, with 35 men aboard.

Following the capture of German possessions in the region, the AN&MEF provided occupation forces for the duration of the war. On 9 January 1915, Holmes handed over command of the AN&MEF to Brigadier General Sir Samuel Pethebridge, the former Secretary of the Department of Defence. Holmes returned to Australia and re-enlisted in the AIF, as did most of his men. They were replaced by the 3rd Battalion, known as the "Tropical Force" because it had been specially enlisted for service in the tropics. Pethebridge established the administrative structures that remained through the period of military occupation. Although required by international law to follow the German forms of government, the territory gradually acquired the appearance of a British colony.

== First Australian Imperial Force ==
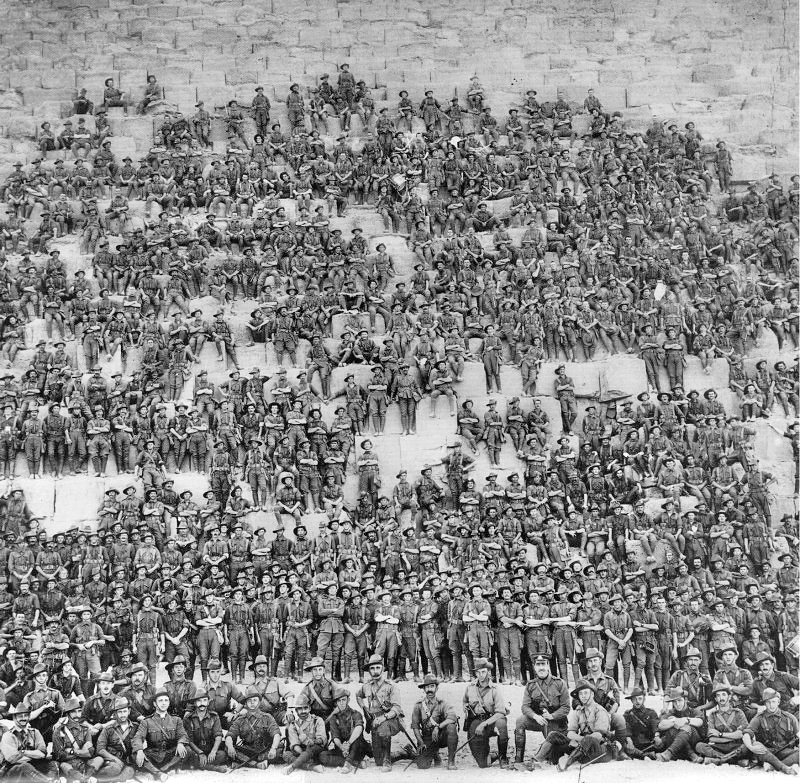
Soldiers of 11th Battalion, AIF, posing on the Great Pyramid of Giza on 10 January 1915, before the landing at Gallipoli

At the start of the war, Australia's military forces were focused upon the militia and what Regular forces existed were mostly serving in the artillery or engineers and were assigned in most part to the task of coastal defence. Due to the provisions of the Defence Act 1903, which precluded sending conscripts overseas, upon the outbreak of war it was realised that a totally separate, all volunteer force would need to be raised. This force was known as the Australian Imperial Force (AIF). (Note: The AIF raised for World War I service has subsequently been called the First AIF to distinguish it from the Second AIF which was raised during World War II.)

The AIF began forming shortly after the outbreak of war and was the brain child of Bridges and White. Upon formation, the AIF consisted of only one infantry division, the 1st Division, and the 1st Light Horse Brigade. The 1st Division was made up of the 1st Infantry Brigade under Colonel Henry MacLaurin; the 2nd, under Colonel James Whiteside McCay, an Australian politician and former Minister for Defence; and the 3rd, under Colonel Ewen Sinclair-Maclagan, a British regular officer seconded to the Australian Army before the war. The 1st Light Horse Brigade was commanded by Colonel Harry Chauvel, an Australian regular, and the divisional artillery was commanded by Colonel Talbot Hobbs.

In the early stages of mobilisation the men of the AIF were selected under some of the toughest criteria of any army in World War I and roughly 30 per cent of men that applied were rejected on medical grounds. Applicants had to be aged between 18 and 35 years of age (although it is believed that men as old as 70 and as young as 14 managed to enlist) and they had to be at least five-foot six inches tall (168 centimetres), with a chest measurement of at least 34 inches (86 centimetres). Many of these strict requirements were lifted later in the war, as the need for replacements grew. Indeed, casualties among the initial volunteers were so high, that of the 32,000 original soldiers of the AIF only 7,000 would survive to the end of the war.

The initial response was so good that in September 1914 the decision was made to raise the 4th Infantry Brigade and 2nd and 3rd Light Horse Brigades. The 4th Infantry Brigade was commanded by Colonel John Monash, a prominent Melbourne civil engineer and businessman. The AIF continued to grow through the war, eventually numbering five infantry divisions, two mounted divisions and a mixture of other units. A sixth infantry division, the 6th Division, was partially formed in the United Kingdom February 1917. Casualties from the First Battle of Bullecourt and the Battle of Messines caused the disbandment of the partially formed unit to allow the other five divisions to be brought back up to strength.

== Gallipoli ==
=== Background ===
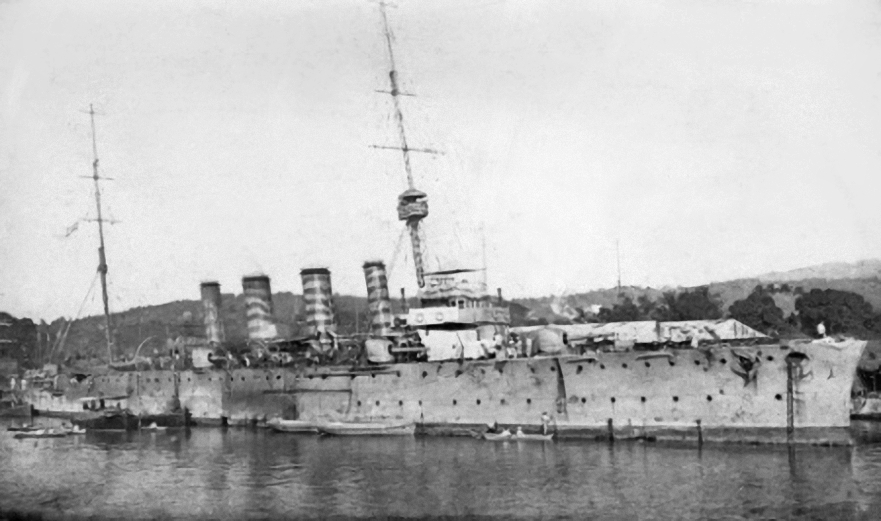
The light cruiser HMAS Sydney (1912) in 1915. In November 1914, it engaged and defeated the German cruiser Emden off the Cocos Islands.

The 1st Division departed Australia from Albany, Western Australia on 1 November 1914 in convoy of 10 transports escorted by several British, Australian and Japanese warships. Initially bound for British-controlled Egypt, with a stopover in Ceylon, the convoy had been delayed several times due to fears of interception by German warships in the area. These fears later proved valid when the German cruiser Emden was sighted off Cocos Island. As the convoy steered to avoid the threat, the Australian cruiser HMAS Sydney, engaged the Emden with her heavier guns and after an engagement that lasted only twenty-five minutes, the Sydney emerged victorious.

The threat of the German Squadron neutralised, the convoy was able to continue its voyage unmolested. Upon their arrival in Egypt in November, the 1st Division moved to Camp Mena, near Cairo, where they were used to defend the Suez Canal against Turkey, which had declared war on 29 October; the Australians commenced a period of training to prepare them for combat on the Western Front as it was still expected that they would be sent to England for deployment in the European theatre. As they waited, the Australian and New Zealand forces in Egypt at the time were formed into the Australian and New Zealand Army Corps (ANZAC) under the command of British Army Lieutenant General William Birdwood, and consisting of the Australian 1st Division and the composite New Zealand and Australian Division (NZ&A).

Overcrowding and shortages of equipment in England meant that it was decided to keep the Anzacs in Egypt during the European winter, during which time they would undertake further training to prepare them for their eventual use in the trenches in France. Despite this, the training that the Australians and New Zealanders received in this time could be considered only very rudimentary in nature, and despite popular opinion at the time, it did little to prepare them for what was to come.

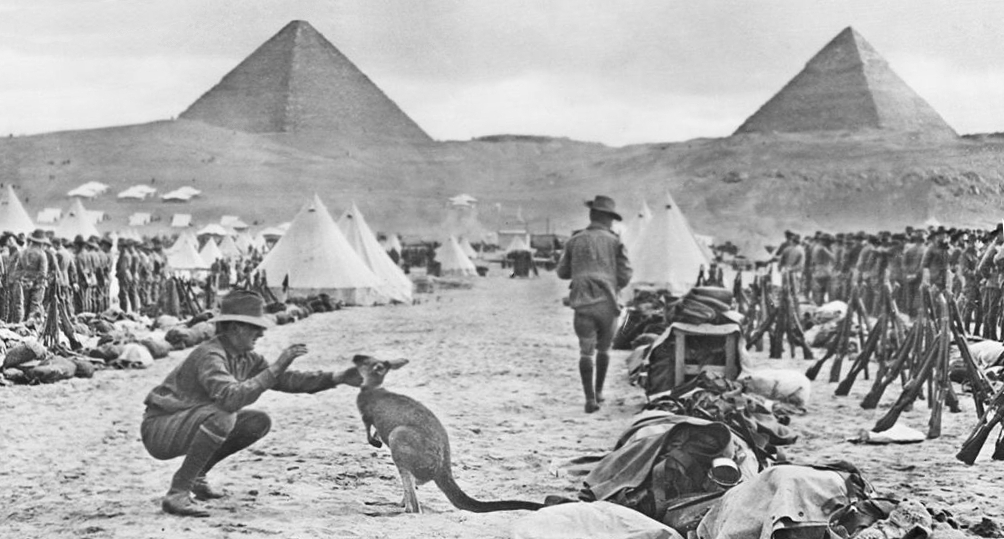
Australian troops at Mena Camp, Egypt, December 1914, looking towards the Pyramids. Many Australian units brought kangaroos and other Australian animals with them to Egypt, and some were given to the Cairo Zoological Gardens when the units went to Gallipoli.

In the background, though, moves were being made to commit the Australians and New Zealanders elsewhere. Later in November, Winston Churchill, in his capacity as First Lord of the Admiralty, put forward his first plans for a naval attack on the Dardanelles. A plan for an attack and invasion of the Gallipoli peninsula was eventually approved by the British cabinet in January 1915. It was decided that the Australian and New Zealand troops would take part in the operation, although they were outnumbered by the British, Indian and French contingents, a fact which is often overlooked today by many Australians and New Zealanders. The objective of the invasion was to open up another front against the Central Powers and to open the Black Sea's only entrance to the Mediterranean, via the Dardanelles and Bosphorus, to allow shipping to Russia all year round.

After the failure of naval attacks, it was decided that ground forces were necessary to eliminate the Turkish mobile artillery and allow minesweepers to clear the waters for larger vessels. The British Secretary of State for War, Field Marshal Lord Kitchener, appointed General Sir Ian Hamilton to command the Mediterranean Expeditionary Force (MEF) that was to carry out the mission. The MEF consisted of Birdwood's ANZAC, British 29th Division, British Royal Naval Division and the French Corps expéditionnaire d'Orient. Some 40,000 Russian troops would participate in the capture or occupation of Constantinople.

=== Landing at Anzac Cove ===
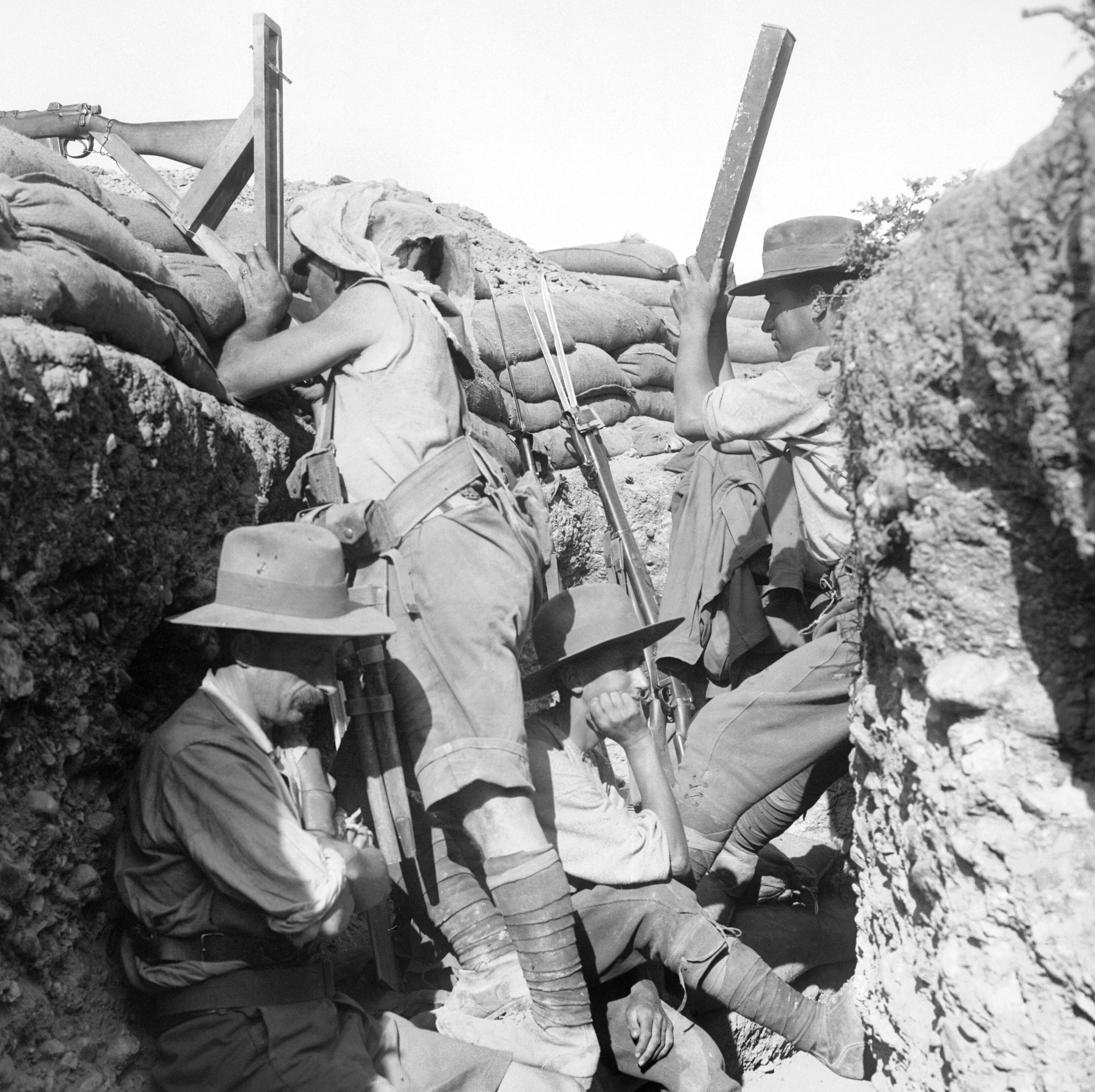
In the Front Line, Anzac Cove 1915 H84.356/33 State Library Victoria

The invasion plan was for the 29th Division to land at Cape Helles on the tip of the peninsula and then advance upon the forts at Kilitbahir. The Anzacs were to land north of Gaba Tepe on the Aegean coast from where they could advance across the peninsula and prevent retreat from or reinforcement of Kilitbahir. The Anzac assault force, the 3rd Brigade of the Australian 1st Division, began to go ashore shortly before dawn at 4:30 am on 25 April 1915. The intended landing zone was a broad front centred about a mile north of Gaba Tepe, possibly due to navigational error or an unexpected current, the landing went awry and the boats concentrated about a mile and a half further north than intended in a shallow, nameless cove between Ari Burnu to the north and Hell Spit to the south. Since 1985, the cove has been officially known as Anzac Koyu (Anzac Cove).

The Anzacs were confronted by a treacherous, confusing tangle of ravines and spurs that descended from the heights of the Sarı Baır range to the sea. The landing was only lightly opposed by scattered Turkish units until Mustafa Kemal, commanding the 19th Division and perceiving the threat posed by the landings, rushed reinforcements to the area in what became a race for the high ground. The contest for the heights was decided on the second ridge line where the Anzacs and Turks fought over a knoll called Baby 700. The position changed hands several times on the first day before the Turks, having the advantage of the higher ground on Battleship Hill, took final possession of it. Once the Anzac advance was checked, the Turks counter-attacked, trying to force the invaders back to the shore, but failed to dislodge them from the foothold they had gained. A trench perimeter quickly developed and a bloody stalemate ensued until August.

=== Krithia ===
In May 1915, Hamilton decided to concentrate his resources in the Helles sector. Birdwood withdrew Colonel McCay's 2nd Infantry Brigade and the New Zealand Infantry Brigade and they moved by sea to Cape Helles on 6 May. During the subsequent Second Battle of Krithia the two brigades suffered 1,827 casualties, including McCay, in an ill-advised daylight advance over open ground that could have been occupied after dark without loss. During May Turkish snipers were particularly active in Monash Valley. On 15 May, one shot and fatally wounded Major General Bridges. His body was returned to Australia and buried on the hill overlooking Royal Military College, Duntroon in Canberra. The Australian government sent Major General James Gordon Legge from Australia to replace him.

=== Turkish counter-attack ===
On 19 May 1915, the Turkish launched an assault against the Anzac perimeter. Forewarned by naval reconnaissance aircraft, the troops were on alert and the position was reinforced by the return of the 2nd and New Zealand Infantry Brigades from Cape Helles and the arrival of the 1st Light Horse Brigade and New Zealand Mounted Rifles Brigade from Egypt. Along most of the line, the attack met with immediate disaster, the Turkish attackers being swept away by the rifle and machine gun fire of the Anzac defenders. At Courtney's Post, one of the most exposed parts of the perimeter, the Turks managed to enter the trenches but there they encountered Lance Corporal Albert Jacka and others, who drove them out again. For his action, Jacka became the first Australian to win the Victoria Cross in the war.

=== August offensive ===
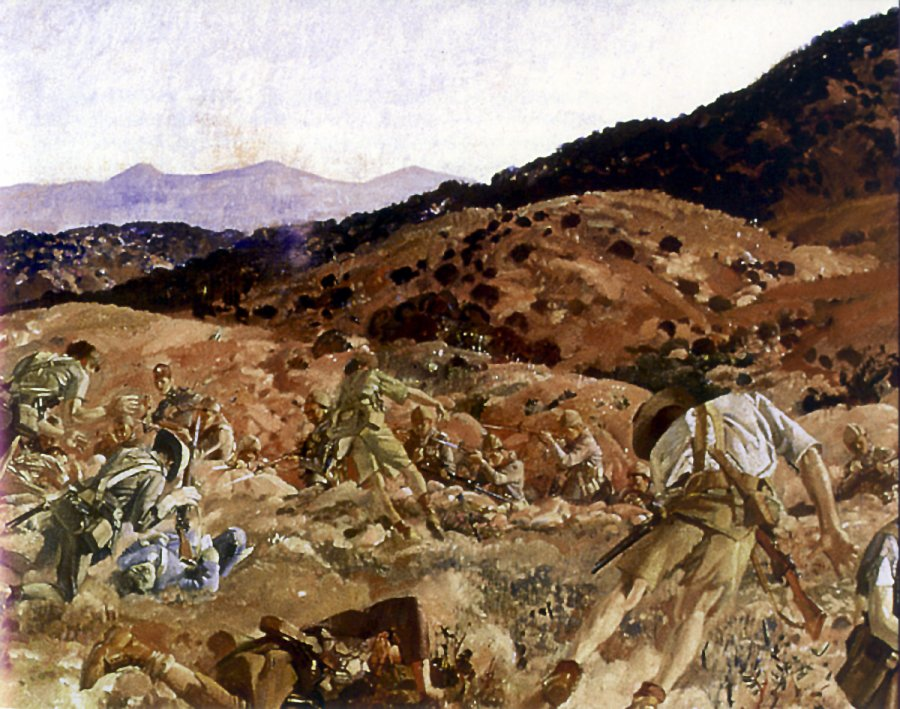
The Charge of the 3rd Light Horse Brigade at the Nek, 7 August 1915 by George Lambert, 1924

The repeated failure of the Allies to capture Krithia or make any progress on the Helles front led Hamilton to pursue an imaginative new plan for the campaign. On the night of 6 August a fresh landing of two infantry divisions was to be made at Suvla, 5 miles (8 km) north of Anzac. Meanwhile, at Anzac a strong assault would be made on the Sari Bair range by breaking out through thinly defended sector at the north of the Anzac perimeter. The offensive was preceded on the evening of 6 August by diversionary assaults at Helles and Anzac. At Helles, the diversion at Krithia Vineyard became another futile battle with no gains and heavy casualties for both sides. At Anzac, an attack on the Turkish trenches at Lone Pine by the infantry brigades of the Australian 1st Division was a rare victory for the ANZACs. At a cost of over 2,000 men, the Australians inflicted 7,000 casualties on the Turks. Because it was an effective attack on a vital position, it was the most effective diversionary attack carried out by the Australians of the war, drawing in the Turkish reserves.

The main assault aimed at the peaks of Chunuk Bair and Hill 971 was less successful. The force striking for the nearer peak of Chunuk Bair comprised the New Zealand Infantry Brigade. It came within 500 metres (1,600 ft) of the peak by dawn on 7 August but was not able to seize the summit until the following morning. This delay had fatal consequences for another supporting attack on the morning of 7 August, that of the 3rd Light Horse Brigade at the Nek which was to coincide with the New Zealanders attacking back down from Chunuk Bair against the rear of the Turkish defences. The New Zealanders held out on Chunuk Bair for two days before relief was provided by two New Army battalions from the Wiltshire and Loyal North Lancashire Regiments. A massive Turkish counter-attack, led in person by Mustafa Kemal, swept these two battalions from the heights. Meanwhile, the landing at Suvla Bay was only lightly opposed but the British commander, Lieutenant General Sir Frederick Stopford, had so diluted his early objectives that little more than the beach was seized. Again the Turks were able to win the race for the high ground of the Anafarta Hills thereby rendering the Suvla front another case of static trench warfare.

The Suvla landing was reinforced by the arrival of the British 53rd and 54th Divisions along with the British 10th Division from Kitchener's New Army divisions plus the dismounted yeomanry of the 2nd Mounted Division. The unfortunate 29th Division was also shifted from Helles to Suvla for one more push. The final British attempt to resuscitate the offensive came on 21 August with attacks at Scimitar Hill and Hill 60. Control of these hills would have united the Anzac and Suvla fronts, but neither battle was successful. When fighting at Hill 60 ceased on 29 August, the battle for the Sari Bair heights, and indeed the battle for the peninsula, was effectively over.

=== Evacuation ===
After eight months of bloody fighting it was decided to evacuate the entire force on the Gallipoli peninsula. Troop numbers were progressively reduced from 7 December and cunning ruses were performed to fool the Turks and to prevent them from discovering the Allies that were departing. At Anzac, the troops would maintain utter silence for an hour or more until the curious Turks would venture out to inspect the trenches, whereupon the Anzacs would open fire. As the numbers in the trenches were thinned, rifles were rigged to fire by water dripped into a pan attached to the trigger. In what was ironically the best planned operation of the campaign, the evacuation was completed by dawn on 20 December 1915, without a single casualty.

Ultimately the Gallipoli campaign was a disastrous failure. It did not achieve any of the objectives that had been given as a justification for it, and due to the inexperience of high commanders and mismanagement there were an unacceptably high casualties among the participating troops, not only from as a result of combat, but also due to widespread disease that resulted from poor sanitation and hygiene in the front lines and a breakdown in the casualty clearance and resupply and logistics systems. It has been estimated that over the course of the campaign there were 26,111 Australian casualties with 8,141 killed. Other Allied casualties—killed and wounded—included: 7,571 New Zealanders, 120,000 British and 27,000 French.

After the war, the bad conditions and high casualties among the Anzac troops resulted in a reasonably prevalent view in Australia that these had been due to the incompetence of British officers commanding the Australian troops and their disregard for the casualties that resulted from poorly planned or ill-conceived attacks. Whether these claims are valid or not, there can be little doubt that the entire campaign was poorly conducted, and as a result there were many military lessons learnt that were to be applied in later campaigns. Despite this, for Australians and New Zealanders the Gallipoli campaign has come to symbolise an important milestone in the emergence of both nations as independent actors on the world stage and the development of a sense of national identity. Today, the date of the initial landings, 25 April, is a public holiday known as Anzac Day in Australia and New Zealand and every year thousands of people gather at memorials in both nations, and indeed in Turkey, to honour the bravery and sacrifice of the original Anzacs, and of all those who have subsequently lost their lives in war.

== Egypt and Palestine ==
=== Reorganisation in Egypt ===
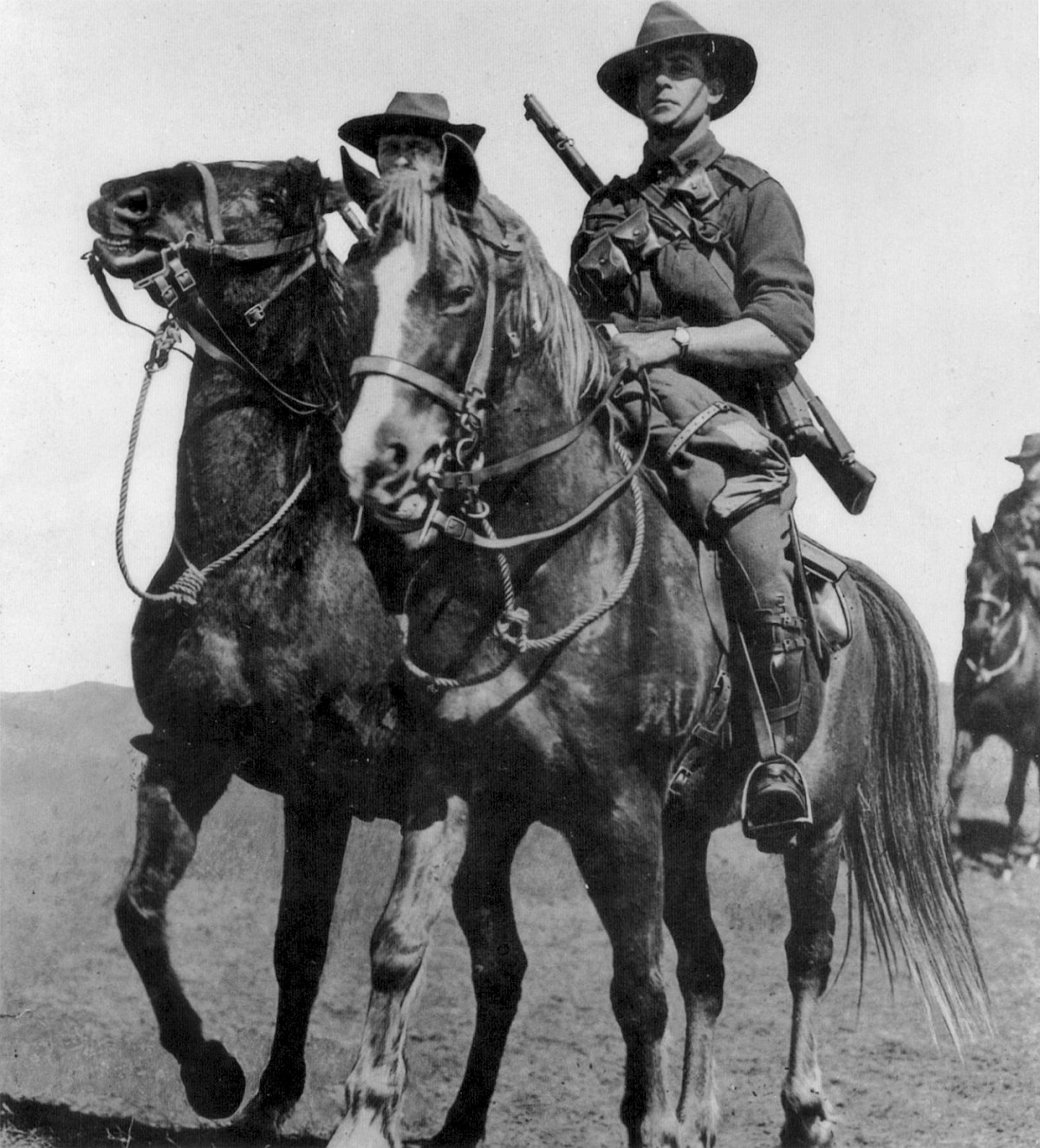
Australian light horsemen on Walers

After the Gallipoli campaign, Australian troops returned to Egypt and the AIF underwent a major expansion, which involved the raising of another three infantry divisions—the 3rd, 4th and 5th—and the establishment of the Anzac Mounted Division. In March 1916, the infantry began to move to France while the cavalry units stayed in the area and fought Turkish troops and the Senussi Arab tribes that were threatening British control of Egypt. Mounted troops were particularly important in the defence of Egypt and Australian troops of the Anzac Mounted Division saw action in all the major battles of the campaign, first seeing combat in the Battle of Romani. Apart from the horsemen, the mounted troops included the 1st Imperial Camel Corps Brigade. This was organised as a mounted infantry brigade. Of its four battalions, the 1st and 3rd were composed of Australians, the 2nd was British, and the 4th was half Australian and half New Zealand. The cameliers participated in most of the fighting in Egypt and Palestine until the brigade was disbanded in July 1918. The Australian and New Zealand components then traded their camels for horses and became the 5th Light Horse Brigade.

=== Fighting the Senussi Arabs ===
In response to the growing threat from a pro-Turkish Islamic Arab sect known as the Senussi, a composite British force—the "Western Frontier Force"—under the command of the British Indian Army officer Major General Alexander Wallace, was sent into the Libyan Desert to Mersa Matruh in late-November 1915. This force included a composite regiment of Australian light horse and the horse transport of the 1st Division. A series of sharp battles against the Arabs ensued at Um Rakhum, Gebel Medwa and Halazin during December and January. British casualties were comparatively light, although many were killed or wounded, including Australians. Arab losses were much higher, hundreds being killed during the fighting. Meanwhile, several Australian Light Horse units returning from Gallipoli were sent further south to guard the edge of the Nile Valley against the Senussi. The 1st Armoured Car Section was also involved in guarding the Western Desert until it was sent to Palestine as the 1st Light Car Patrol at the end of 1916.

=== Battle of Romani ===
The Battle of Romani took place near the Egyptian town of Romani, 23 miles (37 km) east of the Suez Canal, on 3–5 August 1916. The goal of the Turkish and German army was to control or destroy the Suez Canal, thereby denying the use of the waterway to the Allies and in doing so aiding the Central Powers. Both the Anzac Mounted Division, under Major General Harry Chauvel, and the 52nd (Lowland) Infantry Division saw action against the German and Turkish force.

Since first making contact with the advancing German and Turkish force on 20 July they had been harassed alternately by the Australian 1st and 2nd Light Horse Brigades. During the night of 3–4 August, the day before the battle commenced, both brigades were involved in fighting. By about midday on 4 August, the Turkish and German force had pushed the two Australian brigades back to a point where the 52nd (Lowland) Infantry Division, in their trenches, were able to attack the Turkish right flank, and the New Zealand Mounted Rifles Brigade and British 5th Mounted Brigade arrived from their deployment protecting the Suez Canal, to extend the Australians' line on the left flank. The Turkish and German advance was stopped by the fire brought to bear on them by the combined British infantry and Australian, British and New Zealand mounted forces and by the deep sand, the midday summer heat, and thirst.

In these extremely tough conditions, the British infantry were unable to move effectively against the retreating German and Turkish force in the following days. Alone, the Anzac Mounted Division was unable to stop the retreating force withdrawing to Katia and eventually back to their base at Bir el Abd. This base was abandoned the day after it was attacked by the Anzac Mounted Division, on 12 August 1916, ending any threat to the Suez Canal for the remainder of the war. The battle cost the Allies 1,202 casualties of which 222 were killed, 71 died of wounds and 909 were wounded; half of these were Australians.

=== Battle of Magdhaba ===
Following the victory at Romani the Anzac Mounted Division pushed the German and Turkish Army back across the Sinai Peninsula. The German and Turkish forces had been put on the defensive and retreated from Bir el Abd on 12 August 1916 towards the Egyptian–Turkish frontier, the day after being attacked by the Anzac Mounted Division. A Turkish rearguard action was fought at Bir el Mazar before the German and Turkish force retired to El Arish in September. In the Maghara Hills in October 1916 a strongly defended position was attacked by an Allied force based on the Suez Canal. Both Bir el Mazar and Maghara Hills positions were subsequently abandoned. During November, an aerial bombing raid by 5 B.E.s and a Martinsyde, the largest air attack yet organised in the East was carried out on Beersheba. By the beginning of December the railway had reached Bir el Mazar and with the development of lines of communications, garrisons, support and services, it became possible to plan for an advance to El Arish.

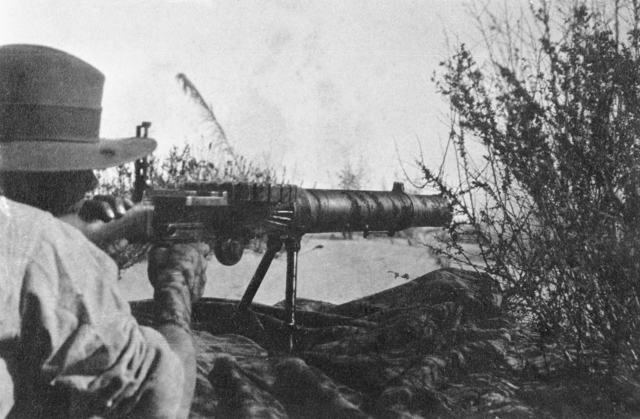
An Australian soldier firing a Lewis Gun during the Battle of Magdhaba

On 21 December, after a night march of 30 miles (48 km) the Anzac Mounted Division, commanded by Chauvel, entered El Arish, which had been abandoned by the German and Turkish force who had retreated to Madghaba where the mounted force won a fierce daylong engagement against strong well constructed defences manned by determined defenders. Situated on the British right flank, the Egyptian outpost of Magdhaba was some 23 miles (37 km) to the south-south-east into the Sinai desert, from El Arish on the Mediterranean coast. With Turkish forces on the defensive, Madghaba, along with another position at Rafa, were the last main obstacles standing in the way of the Egyptian Expeditionary Force's advance into Palestine. Chauvel, with the agreement of Lieutenant General Philip Chetwode commanding the Desert Column who had arrived earlier that day, set out to attack the Turkish forces at Magdhaba with the Anzac Mounted Division. Leaving at about midnight on 22 December, the Anzac Mounted Division was in a position by 03.50 am on 23 December to see enemy fires still some miles away at Magdhaba.

With the 1st Light Horse Brigade in reserve, Chauvel sent the New Zealand Mounted Rifles Brigade and the 3rd Light Horse Brigade to move on Magdhaba by the north and north-east to cut off the possibility of retreat while the Imperial Camel Corps Brigade followed the telegraph line straight to Magdhaba. The 1st Light Horse Brigade advanced mounted to the attack but fierce shrapnel fire forced them to advance up the wadi bed. By midday all three brigades and the Camel Brigade, despite support from machine-guns and artillery, were hotly engaged. Aerial reconnaissance from Australian and British aircraft, which scouted out the Turkish positions, greatly assisted the attack, although the Turkish positions were obscured by the effect of a mirage and dust clouds.

When the fighting began the going was tough and by 1.00 pm, after hearing that the Turkish defenders still had possession of most of the water in the area, Chauvel decided to call off the attack. The message reached the commander of the 1st Light Horse Brigade just as the Australians were preparing to assault the main redoubt, and the message was deliberately misplaced until the attack had commenced. Both the 1st Light Horse and the New Zealand Mounted Rifle Brigades made progress capturing about 100 prisoners and by 3.30 pm the Turkish defenders began to surrender. By 4.30 pm, the entire Turkish garrison had surrendered, having suffered heavy casualties, and the town was captured. The victory cost the Australians 22 dead and 121 wounded.

=== Battle of Rafa ===
Two and a half weeks later, on the evening of 8 January 1917 the mounted units of the Desert Column commanded by Chetwode rode out of El Arish towards Rafa where a 2,000-strong Turkish garrison was based. The attacking force comprised the Australian 1st Light Horse Brigade, 3rd Light Horse Brigade and the New Zealand Mounted Rifles Brigade of the Anzac Mounted Division under the command of Chauvel, the 5th Mounted Brigade and three battalions of the Imperial Camel Corps Brigade. After a long night march, the Egyptian Expeditionary Force attacked the strongly entrenched position at El Magruntein. A fierce day-long battle resulted in the mounted troops (fighting dismounted) capturing the town around nightfall with the loss of 71 killed and 415 wounded. The Turkish garrison suffered heavily, with 200 killed and another 1,600 taken prisoner.

=== Fighting around Gaza, 1917 ===
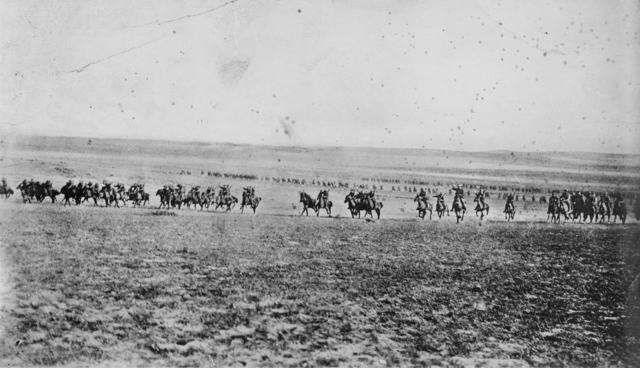
Photograph claimed to be of the charge of the 4th Light Horse Brigade at Beersheba, although it may be a re-enactment taken in February 1918

In early 1917, the Imperial Mounted Division was formed from the 3rd and 4th Light Horse Brigades and two British mounted brigades. The division first saw service during the First Battle of Gaza, which occurred in southern Gaza on 26 March 1917. At around noon two mounted brigades of the Anzac Mounted Division attacked Gaza from the north and east. At 6.00 pm the Turkish position had become perilous with the ring closing tightly around Gaza. In a decision that dismayed most of their soldiers, the British commanders decided to call off the attack and retreat, delivering victory to the Turks. A second attempt was made to capture Gaza on 19 April by which time the Turkish defences were even more formidable and the task confronting the British even more difficult. This battle became known as the Second Battle of Gaza. The Anzac Mounted Division played only a minor role in this battle suffering only 105 casualties out of the 5,917 suffered. The second battle of Gaza was a disastrous defeat for the Allied forces.

In June 1917, the Imperial Mounted Division was renamed as the Australian Mounted Division. In August 1917 Chauvel was placed in command of the Desert Mounted Corps, which included the two Australian mounted divisions, as well as the British Yeomanry Division and the Imperial Camel Corps Brigade. Chauvel became the first Australian to command a corps, as well as the first to achieve the rank of lieutenant general.

With the failure of the Second Battle of Gaza a third assault was launched on Gaza between 31 October and 7 November 1917. Units from the Anzac Mounted Division and the Australian Mounted Division took part in the battle. The battle was a complete success for the Allies. The Gaza–Beersheba line was completely overrun and 12,000 Turkish soldiers were captured or surrendered. The critical moment of the battle was the capture of the town of Beersheba on the first day by Australian light horsemen. The Australian 4th Light Horse Brigade, under Brigadier General William Grant, charged more than 4 miles (6.4 km) at the Turkish trenches, overran them and captured the wells at Beersheba. In the capture of Beersheba, the Australians lost 31 men killed. A further 32 were wounded, and 80 horses were lost. On the Turkish side, more than 500 men were killed and 1,500 captured as well as nine artillery pieces, several machine guns, and other pieces of equipment.

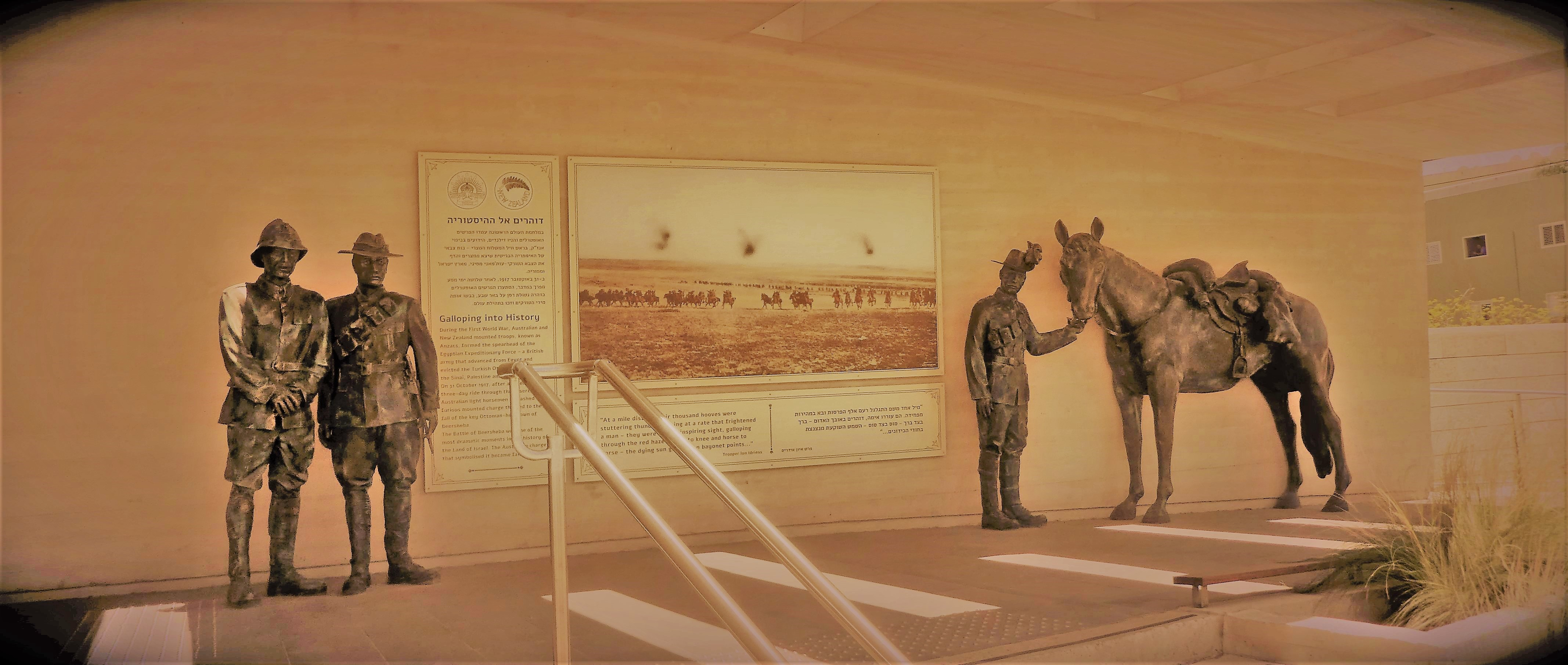
The Be'er Sheva Anzac Memorial Centre, Israel

=== Fighting advance ===
From 1 to 7 November, strong Turkish rearguards at Tel el Khuweilfe in the southern Judean Hills, at Hareira and Sheria on the maritime plain and at Sausage Ridge and Gaza close to the Mediterranean coast, held the Egyptian Expeditionary Force in heavy fighting. During this time the Turkish Army was able to withdraw in good order. The rearguard garrisons themselves were also able to retire under cover of darkness, during the night of 6/7 or 7/8 November. On 7 and 8 November, the surviving units of the 7th and 8th Turkish armies further delayed the advance of Desert Mounted Corps commanded by Chauvel and the XXI Corps's 52nd (Lowland) Division and the 75th Yeomanry Division.

All other units of the Egyptian Expeditionary Force had come to the end of their lines of communication. These units were the XXI Corps' 54th (East Anglian) Division resting at Gaza and the Imperial Service Cavalry Brigade at Beit Hanun. Also in the rear was the whole of Chetwode's XX Corps which had transferred its transport to XXI Corps. Its 53rd (Welsh) Division and corps cavalry, together with the New Zealand Mounted Rifles Brigade, were deployed in the front line near Tel el Khuweilfe, in the Judean Hills north of Beersheba. While its 60th (London) Infantry Division was resting at Huj, its 10th (Irish) Division and 74th Infantry Division were both resting back at Karm.

The Desert Mounted Corps and the two infantry divisions of XX Corps became involved in a series of engagements during the days leading up to the battle and on the day after. These began on 10 November when one brigade of the 52nd (Lowland) Division and two brigades of the Anzac Mounted Division commanded by Major General Edward Chaytor successfully pushed across the Nahr Sukereir to establish a bridgehead on the Turkish right flank. Three brigades of the Australian Mounted Division under the command of Major General Henry West Hodgson ran into the Turkish rearguard's left flank around the village of Summeil. The mounted troops occupied the village on 11 November but were unable to advance further due to intense Turkish artillery fire which continued throughout the day.

On 12 November Allenby made preparations for battle the following day. He ordered an attack by the 52nd (Lowland) Division to extend their position across the Nahr Sukereir on the Turkish Army's right flank. Reinforced with two more brigades, he ordered the Australian Mounted Division to advance towards Tel es Safi where they encountered a determined and substantial Turkish counterattack. This counterattack forced the mounted division to concede the territory gained during the day, before fighting the Turkish Army to a standstill in front of Summeil. On the morning after the battle at Mughar Ridge, Junction Station was occupied and during the following days other villages in the area were found to have been abandoned. Later in the morning of 14 November New Zealand Mounted Rifles Brigade ran into a determined and well entrenched Turkish rearguard near Ayun Kara, which they attacked. Fierce close quarter fighting against the Turkish 3rd Infantry Division continued during the afternoon. Although severely threatened, the New Zealand Mounted Rifle Brigade eventually prevailed and went on to occupy Jaffa two days later.

The Battle of Mughar Ridge was fought on 13 November by the 52nd (Lowland) Division and the 75th Division in the centre, with the Australian Mounted Division on their right flank and the Anzac Mounted Division and Yeomanry Mounted Divisions on the infantry's left flank. The battle was divided into two stages with a pause for artillery to be brought forward. Following the Yeomanry's successful charge up onto El Mughar ridge, two crucial fortified villages were captured by elements of the 52nd (Lowland) Division. This victory resulted in the subsequent occupation of Junction Station, a vital railway station on the Turk's lines of communication between Jaffa and Jerusalem.

=== Jerusalem ===
The Australian mounted troops took part the Capture of Jerusalem in late 1917. These operations included two battles fought in the Judean Hills; the Battle of Nebi Samwil from 17 to 24 November and the Defence of Jerusalem from 26 to 30 December and another fought on the maritime plain; the subsidiary Battle of Jaffa on 21–22 December 1917. This series of battles involved the British Empire's XX Corps, XXI Corps and the Desert Mounted Corps fighting the Turkish 7th Army in the Judean Hills and the 8th Army north of Jaffa on the Mediterranean coast.

After the failure of widespread and determined Turkish counterattacks fought from 27 November to 1 December by the 7th Turkish Army they evacuated Jerusalem. Troops from the Australian Mounted Division were the first mounted troops to enter Jerusalem in December 1917. Towards the end of December the British Empire forces at the Battle of Jaffa and the Defence of Jerusalem succeeded in pushing the Turkish armies north. A strong British defensive line was established which remained in place until mid September 1918. The line stretched across from well north of the Nahr el Auja on the Mediterranean coast in the west to north and east of Jerusalem. It was extended during the middle of February 1918 when Jericho in the Jordan Valley was captured and the eastern end of the line was secured on the Dead Sea.

=== Transjordan operations ===
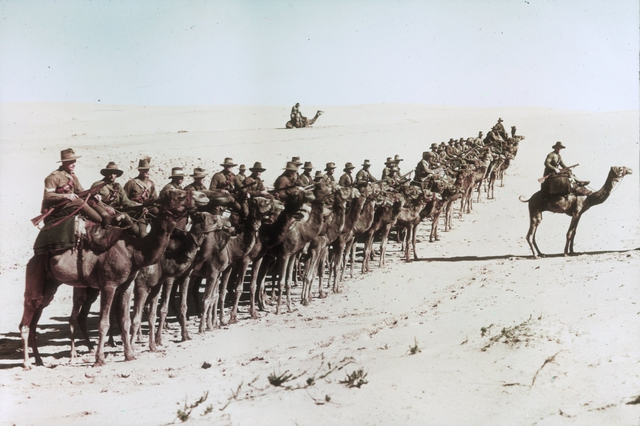
Australian camel company, January 1918

In March and April 1918, Australian and New Zealand mounted troops and British infantry took part in two raids east across the Jordan River to Amman and Es Salt, a village in Palestine 23 kilometres (14 mi) west of Amman. Although these raids were unsuccessful, they encouraged Turkish commanders to believe that the main British effort would be launched across the Jordan when it would be launched along the coastal plain. Before these operations could commence it was necessary to capture the country east of Jerusalem and into the Jordan Valley to Jericho. The attack on the Turkish 26th and 53rd Infantry Divisions was made by the 60th (London) and the Anzac Mounted Divisions on 19 February. Talat ed Dumm, on the road from Jerusalem, was captured the next day and in the evening the Wady Fara and Nebi Musa were also captured. On 21 February Jericho was occupied by the two divisions of the Egyptian Expeditionary Force.

=== Final offensive ===
During the final offensive in September 1918, the two divisions of Australian mounted troops, as well as the 1st Light Car Patrol and No. 1 Squadron AFC, took part in Battle of Megiddo on 28 September 1918, a decisive British victory in which 70,000 Turkish soldiers were taken prisoner. The Desert Mounted Corps attacked across the Golan Heights, cutting off the north and north-west exits to Damascus on 29 September. On 30 September, the head of a column of 20,000 Turkish and German troops was annihilated by the Australian light horsemen as it attempted to withdraw west through the Barada Gorge. Australian troops were the first to enter Damascus, which fell on 1 October. Following an advance of 300 kilometres (190 mi), Aleppo was captured on 25 October. The Turkish government signed an armistice on 28 October 1918 and surrendered outright two days later.

Following the armistice, the Australian Mounted Division went into camp at Tripoli while the Anzac Mounted Division, having borne the brunt of the entire campaign, suffered heavily from malaria and influenza in the Jordan Valley. Australia's role in the Sinai and Palestine campaign was later acknowledged by Field Marshal Edmund Allenby, who had been commander-in-chief of the Allied forces in the Middle East, as having been considerable. Total Australian battle casualties in the campaign were 4,851, including 1,374 dead.

== Western Front ==
=== Transfer to Europe ===
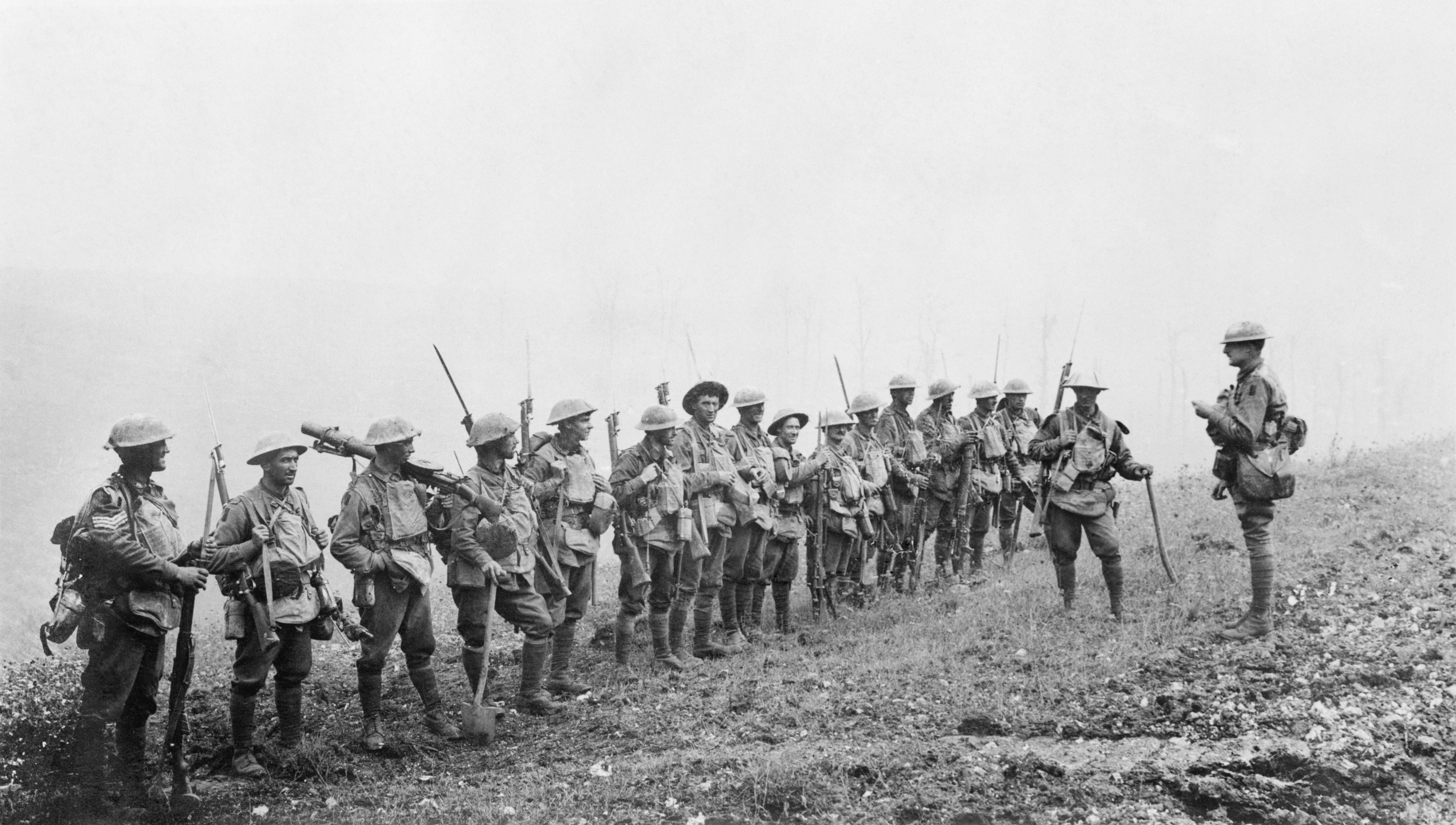
A platoon from the 29th Battalion, AIF, is addressed by their commanding officer in August 1918. The third man from left appears to be carrying a Lewis Gun.

In March 1916, the infantry units of the AIF were transferred from Egypt to Europe for service on the Western Front. Initially they were organised into I Anzac Corps and II Anzac Corps alongside the New Zealand Division. The 2nd Division was the first to arrive in France, followed by the 1st Division; the 4th and 5th left Egypt later in June 1916. The 3rd Division was the last to arrive, having been formed in Australia in March 1916, and moving to England for training in July 1916, before being sent to France in December 1916. For the next two and a half years the constant rotations in and out of the line were punctuated by several major battles, during which the Australians earned for themselves a formidable reputation. On 1 November 1917 the Australian divisions were re-grouped together to form the Australian Corps.

When the 1st Division arrived, it was reunited with its mechanical transport. In September 1914, the Army had decided to supply mechanical transport for the 1st Division and formed a company in New South Wales and one in Victoria. These were the first ever mechanical transport units in the Australian Army. Nearly 200 vehicles were purchased and the two units departed Melbourne for Egypt on 22 December 1914. Unfortunately, vehicles over 5 long tons (5.1 t) were prohibited in Cairo as most bridges could not hold their weight, whereas they possessed vehicles weighing up to 7 long tons (7.1 t). It was therefore arranged for them to continue to England where they arrived on 15 February 1915. There they lived in tents on Salisbury Plain and hauled gravel for roads before being sent to France in July 1915.

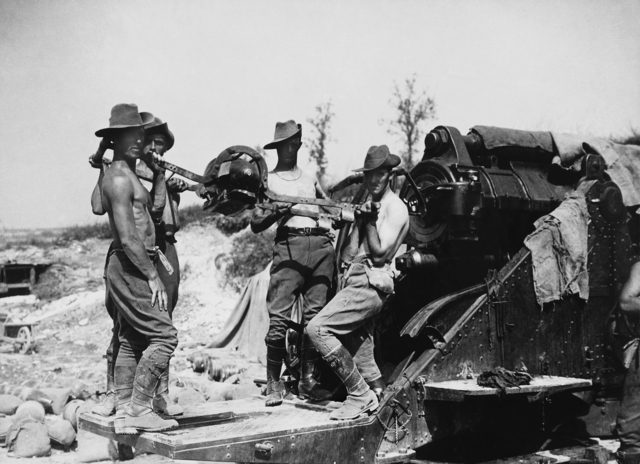
Australian gunners about to load a shell into a 9.2-inch howitzer

They were not the first Australians to serve on the Western Front. An Australian Voluntary Hospital had been formed in England in August 1914 from Australian expatriates. All medical practitioners in the unit were Australians and although women were not allowed to serve as doctors, Australian nurses were accepted. The unit left for France in August 1914 and from October was based at Wimereux, where the 2nd General Hospital joined it in June 1916. In July 1916, the Australian Voluntary Hospital was absorbed into the British Army. Another group of Australians had also arrived in France before I Anzac Corps. In June 1915, the 1st Siege Artillery Brigade was formed under the command of Lieutenant Colonel Walter Adams Coxen, the Australian Army's Director of Artillery, for service on the Western Front. About half the men in the unit were permanent gunners of the Garrison Artillery. The brigade departed Melbourne for England on 17 July 1915 and landed in France on 27 February 1916. Its 54th Siege Battery was equipped with 8-inch howitzers and its 55th Siege Battery with 9.2-inch howitzers.

With the move of the majority of the AIF to France, the base organisation was transferred to the United Kingdom. Most of the training units moved to the Salisbury Plain, establishing depots at Perham Down, Rollestone, Larkhill and Tidworth. When it arrived, the 3rd Division also moved into camps in this area. Command Depots, where men returning from hospitals were sent before being returned to their units, were established at Perham Down, Weymouth, Wool, Dorset and Worgret. Depots for men moving from the United Kingdom to France were established at Étaples. In June 1917, these were swapped with the Canadians for depots around Le Havre, thereby reducing travelling time from the Salisbury Plain. AIF Headquarters was established at the premises of Westminster Training College in Horseferry Road, London and Colonel R. M. McC. Anderson, a businessman, was appointed as its commandant. Anderson negotiated a new method of payment for services provided by the British Army as a per capita per diem payment.

=== Battle of the Somme, 1916 ===
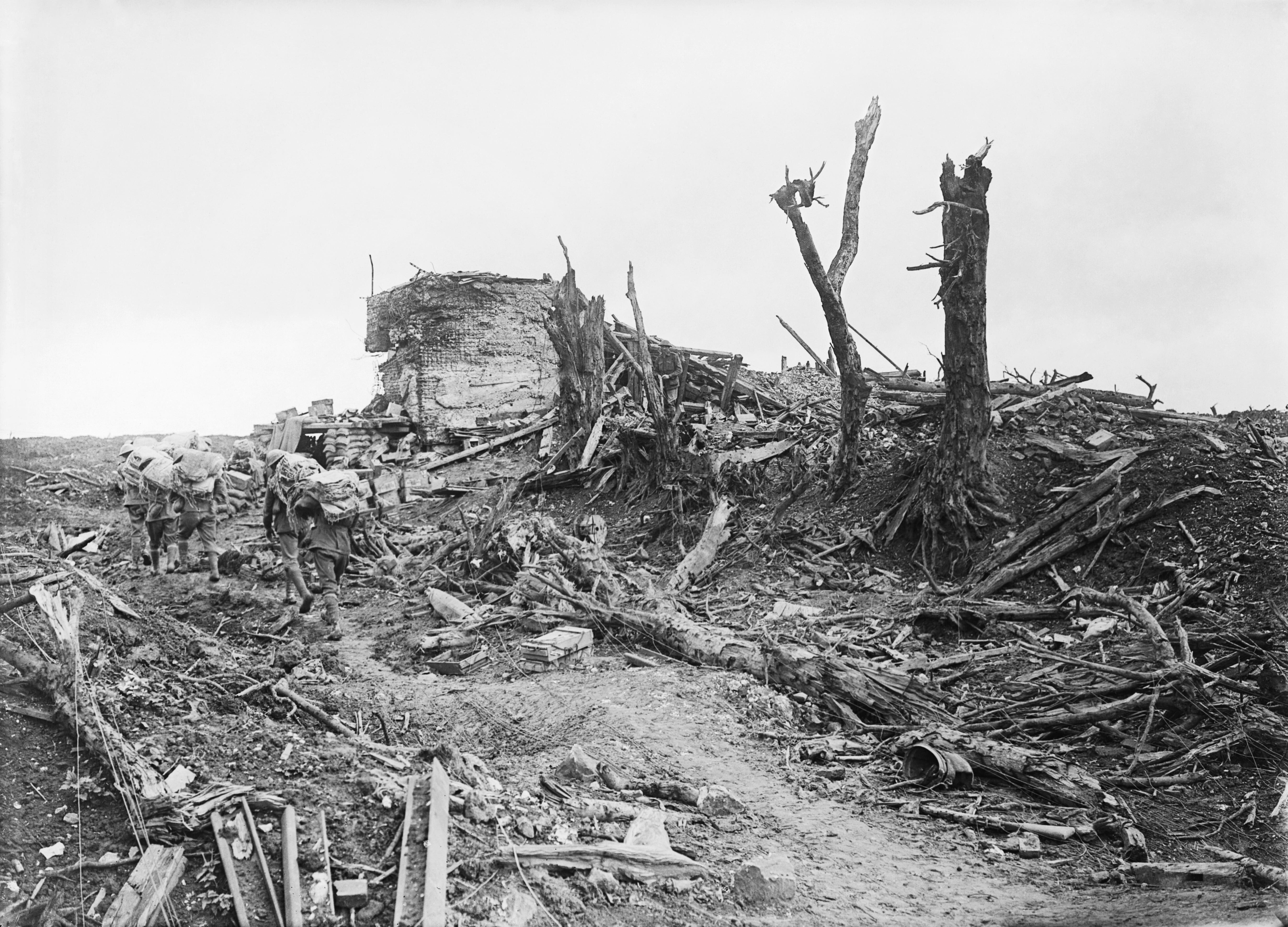
The "Gibraltar" pillbox, Pozières, in late August. A fatigue party laden with sandbags heads for the fighting at Mouquet Farm.

On 7 April 1916, I Anzac Corps took up positions in a quiet sector south of Armentières, known as the "Nursery". The Australians were spared from participating in the disastrous first day on the Somme, but within three weeks of the beginning of the Allied offensive, four divisions of the AIF had been committed to the battle. Only the 3rd Division did not take part, having only just recently arrived in England from Australia. The 5th Division, positioned on the left flank of the salient, was the first to see action during the Battle of Fromelles on 19 July 1916, suffering a staggering 5,533 casualties in a single day.

The 1st Division entered the line on 23 July 1916, taking part in the assault on Pozières. Initially they succeeded in carrying the German positions with relatively small losses, but once the Germans had recovered they directed an intense artillery barrage upon the town which resulted in heavy losses. By the time that they were relieved by the 2nd Division on 27 July, they had suffered 5,286 casualties. Two days after taking over the line, the 2nd Division was thrown into a hastily planned attack that resulted in further casualties when the Germans spotted the Australians forming up and once again subjected them to the weight of their artillery and machine guns. Another attack was launched on 4 August which, although it met with success, resulted again in such heavy casualties—almost 7,000—that the division was relieved the next day.

Following the attack on Pozières the Australians were called upon to attack Mouquet Farm in August. All three divisions of I Anzac Corps were committed in an effort to force a breach in the German lines behind Thiepval, to the north of Pozières. The task of the initial advance fell to the 4th Division on 10 August, which had already suffered 1,000 casualties resisting the final German counter-attack, but in the ensuing battle it would lose a further three times that number as the Australians once again suffered at the hands of the German artillery, finding themselves squeezed into a frontage of less than 1.5 kilometres (0.93 mi) against which the Germans were able to concentrate the weight of their defence. Three more attacks were made over the course of the next three weeks as the Australians fought their way across the shell-pocked countryside to the farm, only to be forced out again shortly after by the concentration of German artillery. The other two divisions of I Anzac fared only slightly better in these attacks and at the end of the engagement, Australian casualties at Mouquet Farm totalled 6,300 men.

As that battle on the Somme dragged on, the Canadian Corps was brought up and the AIF was withdrawn from the line to re-organise and reform, having suffered almost 23,000 casualties over the course of the 45 days that they had been involved. The 5th Division had been so badly mauled, having been incapacitated by the losses they had suffered at Fromelles, that it was not until October that the 5th Division finally returned to the line and joined the 1st, 2nd and 4th Divisions on the Somme near Flers.

=== Battle of Bullecourt ===
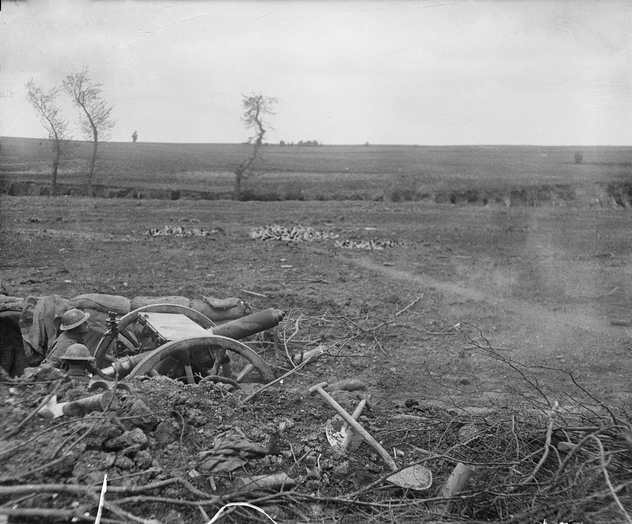
An Australian 18-pounder gun during the Battle of Bullecourt

In March 1917 two 'flying columns' from the 2nd and 5th Divisions pursued the German back to the Hindenburg Line, capturing the town of Bapaume. On 11 April, the 4th Division, consisting of the 4th and 12th Brigades, assaulted the Hindenburg Line in the First Battle of Bullecourt. The battle was a disaster, with over 3,000 casualties and 1,170 taken prisoner by the Germans. On 15 April the 1st and 2nd Divisions were struck by a German counterattack at dawn near the town of Lagnicourt, by a force of up to 23 battalions as the Germans attempted to take advantage of the weakness that had developed in the Allied line following the British offensive at Arras. The Australians were initially forced to abandon the town to the Germans and in the process several artillery batteries were lost. At 7:00 am a successful counterattack was launched by four Australian battalions, resulting in the town being recaptured and the guns reclaimed. Later, on 3 May two brigades of the 2nd Division—the 5th and the 6th—took part in the Second Battle of Bullecourt, where they succeeded in taking sections of the Hindenburg Line and eventually managed to hold most these gains until they were relieved by the 1st Division. On 7 May the 5th Division was committed to relieve the 1st, remaining in the line until the battle ended in mid May. The battle resulted in a victory for the Allies, but the effort cost the AIF some 7,482 casualties and ultimately ended plans to expand the AIF to a sixth division.

=== Battle of Messines ===
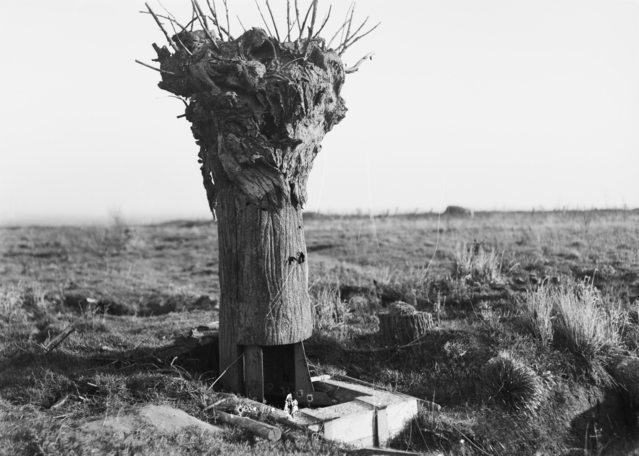
A dummy tree used as an observation post on Hill 63 by Australian troops during the battle of Messines in June 1917

On 7 June 1917, along with two British corps, the II Anzac Corps, consisting of the Australian 3rd Division, the British 25th Division and the New Zealand Division, with the Australian 4th Division attached, launched an operation in the Flanders region of southern Belgium, near Messines The objective was to eliminate a salient that had developed in the line south of Ypres, enclosing the Wytschaete–Messines ridge and thus providing the Germans with good observation and fields of fire that could threaten the major offensive that the British planned to launch around Ypres later in the year. The attack commenced with the detonation of 1,000,000 pounds (450,000 kg) of explosives that had been placed underneath the Messines ridge in 19 separate tunnels, completely destroying the German trenches.

Following the explosions, the Allied advance was virtually unopposed as the Germans were too stunned and demoralised to put up much resistance. Not everything went the Australians' way; the 3rd Division, under Major General John Monash, suffered heavy casualties when they were shelled by phosgene gas and shrapnel shells while moving towards the line of departure, but the division still managed to get into position for the start of the attack. Strong German counterattacks were launched the next day, once again supported by concentrated artillery fire, but the advance was able to continue on through the mess of concrete blockhouses the Germans had erected and continued on until all the objectives had been taken. Australian casualties amounted to nearly 6,800 men. On 2 July 1917, Major General Holmes was mortally wounded by a German shellburst while surveying the Messines battlefield with the Premier of New South Wales, William Holman.

=== Third Battle of Ypres ===
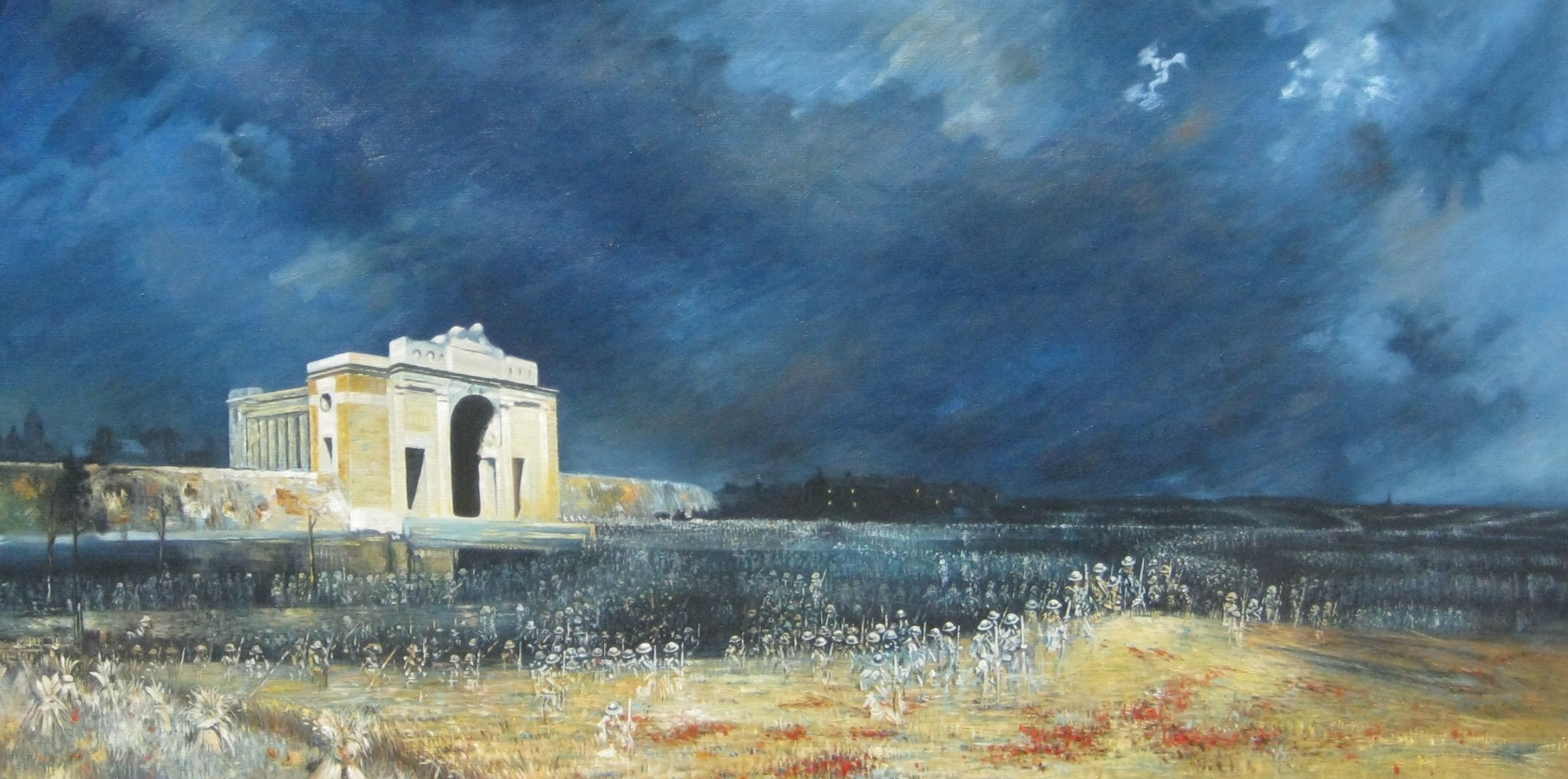
Menin Gate at Midnight by Will Longstaff (1927)

Between September and November 1917, I Anzac Corps took part in actions around Ypres in Belgium as the Allies launched a campaign to capture the Gheluvelt Plateau in Belgium. Collectively these actions have come to be known as the Third Battle of Ypres, of which they were a part, although to Australians they are more commonly known by the names of the places where the individual actions took place—Menin Road, Polygon Wood, Broodseinde, Poelcappelle and Passchendaele.

I Anzac Corps was committed six weeks after the start of the battle and on 16 September, having marched through Ypres the night before, the 1st and 2nd Divisions took up a position in the trenches on the main ridge at Glencorse Wood. The first attack came on 20 September at Menin Road, where the Australians experienced success making considerable gains against the enemy for the loss of about 5,000 casualties. On 26 September, the 4th and 5th Divisions attacked and captured Polygon Wood, and on 4 October another successful attack was made on the main ridge at Broodseinde, where the four Australian divisions involved fought side by side, as they clashed head on with a German counterattack that had been launched at the same time the Australians had risen to carry out their assault. The result was a rout by the Australians, as the German line broke and following further attacks against German pillboxes, the ridge was captured.

The first two attacks had been successful and as Allied commanders began to believe that a breakthrough was possible further attacks were made at Poelcappelle on 9 October and at Passchendaele on 12 October despite heavy rain that turned the ground into a muddy quagmire. Both attacks were ultimately doomed to failure, with heavy casualties, as the attacks foundered in the mud and as the battle petered out, it was decided that it was time for the Australians to be withdrawn from the line. This was completed by 14 November 1917. Over the course of the eight weeks they had been involved in the fighting around Ypres, they had suffered 38,000 casualties.

=== German Spring Offensive, 1918 ===
On 21 March 1918, having been buoyed by the capitulation of Bolshevik Russia, the German Army launched their Spring Offensive against the Allies with a staggering 63 divisions over a front of 70 miles (110 km). As the Allies began to fall back against the tremendous weight of this offensive, on 25 March the Australian 3rd and 4th Divisions were rushed south to Amiens from where they had been holding the line at Messines. The German offensive lasted with varying intensity for the next five months and during this time, all five divisions of the AIF in France were involved in the fighting as they attempted to stem the tide of the German advance, which achieved large territorial gains and at one stage looked like it might ultimately secure a remarkable victory for the Germans as they pushed to within 50 miles (80 km) from Paris late in May. During this time, the Australians were involved in actions at Dernancourt, Morlancourt, Villers-Bretonneux, Hangard Wood, Hazebrouck, and Hamel.

Of these actions, the last one, at Hamel on 4 July 1918, is perhaps the most notable. Even though the action was relatively minor in terms of the scale of previous operations mounted on the Western Front, it is notable because it was the first 'set-piece' operation planned and carried out by the newly appointed commander of the Australian Corps, Lieutenant General John Monash and it has since been used as the model of a successful combined arms attack. Using aircraft, artillery and armour in effective combination with infantry, the attack was over in the space of 93 minutes; although Monash had planned for a 90-minute operation. It achieved its objectives of straightening the Allied line and taking the town of Hamel. The Australians had advanced the line almost 2 kilometres (1.2 mi) across a front of 6.5 kilometres (4.0 mi) and in the process taken roughly 1,600 German prisoners as well as over 200 machine guns, trench mortars and anti-tank weapons. Against this the Australians suffered 1,062 casualties. (Note: A further 142 casualties were suffered by the Australian 15th Brigade who launched a diversionary attack; there were also 176 casualties among the 10 companies of Americans that were also involved in the operation.)

=== Hundred Days Offensive ===
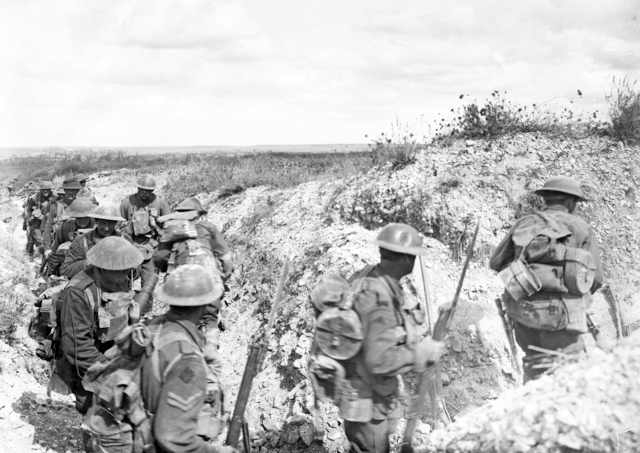
Men of the 6th Brigade during the Battle of Mont St Quentin

The last-ditched effort by the Germans to win the war came to a grinding halt in mid-July and after that there followed a brief period of lull, during which time the Australians undertook a series of small unit actions aimed at capturing parts of the German line with limited support. These actions became known as Peaceful Penetrations and were essentially a cross between trench raids and patrolling. Their success relied heavily upon the leadership and initiative of junior commanders and the ability of soldiers to employ principles of fire and manoeuvre. This lull did not last long, as the Allies were soon ready to launch their own offensive, known as the Hundred Days Offensive, which would bring about an end to the war.

The offensive began on 8 August 1918 when 20 Allied divisions, including four Australian, struck at Amiens on the Somme. Using the combined arms techniques developed earlier at Hamel, the Allies achieved territorial gains that had been unheard of since the start of the war. In the Australian sector, the 4th and 5th Divisions had initially spearheaded the advance, before the 2nd and 3rd Divisions had advanced another three kilometres to secure the secondary objectives. The attack had been so successful that it was later described by German General Erich Ludendorff as a "black day" for the German Army.

Following that the Allied offensive continued for the next four months, right up until the end of the war. During the Second Battle of the Somme the Australian Corps fought actions at Lihons, Etinehem, Proyart, Chuignes, and Mont St Quentin, before taking part in their final engagement of the war on 5 October 1918 at Montbrehain. Australian casualties during these battles were very high and coupled with the drying up of reinforcements from Australia, the rejection of the proposal to introduce conscription and the granting of home leave to men who been serving since 1914 meant that by the end of the war the AIF was stretched to the limit. Consequently, during the height of the offensive it was decided to disband three battalions—the 36th, 47th and 52nd—to reinforce other units.

The engagement at Montbrehain was the Australian Corps' last contribution to the war and they were out of the line training when the Armistice was declared on 11 November 1918. Total Australian casualties on the Western Front numbered 181,000, including 46,000 of whom died. Another 114,000 men were wounded, 16,000 gassed, and approximately 3,850 were taken prisoners of war.

== Other theatres ==
When the war ended, there were 92,000 Australian soldiers in France, 60,000 in England and 17,000 in Egypt, Palestine and Syria. Small numbers were serving in other theatres. Australian troops from the 1st Australian Wireless Signal Squadron provided communications for British forces during the Mesopotamian campaign. They participated in several battles, including the Battle of Baghdad in March 1917 and the Battle of Ramadi in September that year. Meanwhile, following the Russian Revolution in 1917, the Caucasus Front collapsed, leaving Central Asia open to the Turkish Army. A special force, known as Dunsterforce after its commander, Major General Lionel Dunsterville, was formed from hand-picked British officers and NCOs to organise any remaining Russian forces or civilians who were ready to fight the Turkish forces. Some 20 Australian officers served with Dunsterforce in the Caucasus Campaign and one party under Captain Stanley Savige was instrumental in protecting thousands of Assyrian refugees. Australian nurses also staffed four British hospitals in Salonika, and another 10 in India.

== Australian Flying Corps ==
=== Formation ===
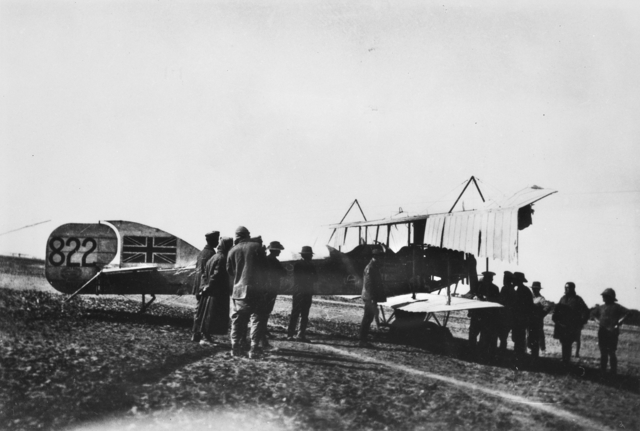
Members of the Half Flight gather around a Short 827 seaplane.

The Australian Flying Corps (AFC) was formed in March 1914 and was soon deployed to German New Guinea, with one BE2c aircraft and crew dispatched with the AN&MEF, although the colonies surrendered before the plane was even unpacked. The first operational flights did not occur until 27 May 1915, when the Mesopotamian Half Flight was called upon to assist the Indian Army in protecting British oil interests in what is now Iraq. The Corps later saw action in Egypt, Palestine and on the Western Front throughout the remainder of the war. Organised into four operational squadrons in France and the Middle East and another four training squadrons in England, the AFC remained part of the AIF.

=== Mesopotamian Half Flight ===
The Mesopotamian Half-Flight—also known as the Australian Half-Flight—was the first AFC unit to see active service. On 8 February 1915, the Australian Government had received a request from the Viceroy of India for air assistance in fighting the Turks. The AFC was still forming and could provide enough aircrew and ground staff for only half a flight: the unit therefore became known as the Mesopotamian Half-Flight and Captain Henry Petre was appointed commander. The AFC contingent sailed for Bombay, and on 20 April 1915 it left for Basra, arriving at the end of May. Flying underpowered and unreliable aircraft such as the Caudron, Maurice Farman Longhorn and Martinsyde, the Half-Flight suffered a high attrition rate, losing two killed and six captured out of its strength of just nine pilots. The arrival of reinforcements allowed the formation of a squadron, (No. 30 Squadron RFC), but by November 1915 only one of the original pilots remained. The squadron was mainly involved in unarmed reconnaissance, although later small 9 pounds (4.1 kg) bombs were added to the aircraft. In October, three Australian aircraft bombed an Arab tribe known to be hostile in an unsuccessful attempt to bring them to surrender. During the siege of Kut, the last Australian pilot in Mesopotamia, Captain Petre, dropped supplies to the garrison. When Kut surrendered, the AFC ground crewmen located in the city were captured, seven of them later dying in captivity. Petre flew the only remaining Shorthorn to Egypt on 7 December 1915, where he rendezvoused with No.1 Squadron AFC, effectively marking the end of the Half-Flight's service.

=== Operations in the Middle East ===
By late 1915 the AFC began forming complete squadrons. At British request No. 1 Squadron was dispatched to Egypt with 28 officers and 195 other ranks, where they were equipped with British aircraft including BE2c and Martinsyde G100. The squadron operated from Heliopolis, Palestine and Syria over the next two years, supporting ground forces in all the major battles of the Palestine campaign against the Turks. Missions included aerial reconnaissance, bombing enemy positions, communications and artillery spotting. They were also involved in many air-to-air battles with German aircraft. It was in this theatre that the Australians first encountered anti-aircraft fire. The squadron was re-equipped in 1917 with BE2a, RE8 and Martinsyde G102 aircraft; by 1918 these types were replaced with Bristol F.2 Fighters. Notably during this time Lieutenant Frank McNamara was awarded the Victoria Cross for rescuing another Australian pilot who had been shot down by ground fire and forced to land close to Turkish positions on 20 March 1917. No. 1 Squadron also took part in the actions at Wadi Fara on 21 September 1918 as part of the Battle of Megiddo, which witnessed the destruction of the bulk of the Turkish Seventh Army by British airpower. (Note: The battle is cited as an early example of the destructive potential of airpower and involved seven British squadrons (including No.1 Squadron AFC). The Turkish Seventh Army was caught in Wadi Fara and was unable to escape due to the steep hills and cliffs which forced them to use the road. The attack began at 6:30 am and continued non-stop until 12:00, No. 1 Squadron alone dropping three tonnes of bombs and expending nearly 24,000 rounds. When British ground forces reached the area the following day they found 87 artillery pieces and nearly 1,000 vehicles abandoned or destroyed. Casualties among the estimated 7,000 Turkish troops caught in the attacks were not established but were believed to have been high.)

=== Fighting on the Western Front ===
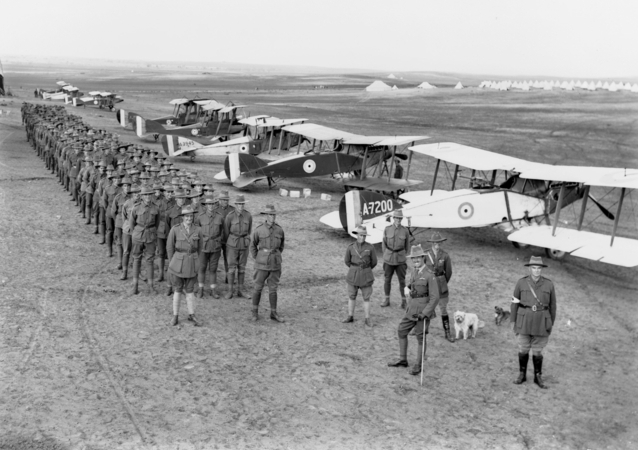
No. 1 Squadron, Australian Flying Corps next to their Bristol fighters, at Mejdel in February 1918. The officer in the foreground (with stick) is Lieutenant Colonel Richard Williams, DSO, commanding.

Other AFC squadrons began forming in Australia for service on the Western Front, Nos. 2, 3 and 4 Squadrons arriving in France between August and December 1917. No. 2 Squadron, equipped with DH5s, was subsequently involved in the Battle of Cambrai on 20 November 1917, conducting patrol duties, ground strafing and bombing enemy troops and positions. Casualties were high with 7 of the squadrons 18 aircraft shot down, and 2 pilots lost. No. 3 Squadron, equipped with RE8s, was supporting the final phase of the Battle of Passchendaele in Flanders, conducting mainly artillery spotting duties. No. 4 Squadron, equipped with Sopwith Camels, was the last to arrive in France, and was assigned to the First Army around Lens. Notably during March 1918 the squadron was engaged in aerial combat with aircraft commanded by Manfred von Richthofen—known as the 'Red Baron'—shooting down two German aircraft for the loss of one of their own. The Lens sector had been relatively quiet until 21 March 1918 when the Germans launched a major offensive, No. 4 Squadron being heavily engaged in low-level bombing to support the 4th Australian Division.

The Australian squadrons played a limited role in the allied advance from Amiens on 8 August 1918, No. 3 Squadron being engaged in reconnaissance and contact patrols to help identify the locations of forward troops. They also undertook extensive aerial photography to aid in remapping and the locating of German artillery positions. During this period Nos. 2 and 4 Squadrons were in the Ypres–Arras area and were involved in patrols and raids on the railways in the vicinity of Lille. With the Germans in retreat during September 1918, the squadrons felt considerable pressure just keeping up. Regardless, No. 4 Squadron took part in, perhaps its most spectacular action, in the very last weeks of the war. On 29 October, 15 Australian Sopwith Snipes encountered more than 60 German Fokkers, in an action which became one of the largest air battles of the war. The Australians gained the upper hand and 10 Fokkers were shot down for the loss of one Snipe, and the damage of several others.

During their time on the Western Front, No. 2 and No 4. Squadrons had been used mainly in the fighter role, and No. 3 Squadron was primarily used for reconnaissance. No. 4 Squadron became the most successful fighter squadron in France, accounting for 199 enemy aircraft; No. 2 Squadron was credited with the destruction of 185. The total AFC casualties on the Western Front included 78 killed, 68 wounded and 33 taken prisoner. Following the end of the war on 11 November 1918, No. 4 Squadron was the only Australian unit assigned to the British Army of Occupation, arriving in Germany in December and being based in Cologne. The three AFC squadrons subsequently handed over their equipment to the RAF in February 1919 and returned to Australia where they disbanded.

=== Legacy ===
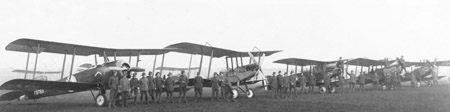
Members of the 7th Squadron in Tetbury England

Despite Australian military aviation being in its infancy, the AFC's identity as a separate national force was considered important, not to mention unusual. Thousands of aircrew from the other Dominions—such as New Zealand and Canada—flew with the Royal Flying Corps and Royal Naval Air Service, and their unified successor force after 1 April 1918, the Royal Air Force during the war, without gaining the benefits of command and the administrative experience which came with an independent air service. By the end of the war, four squadrons had seen active service, 460 officers and 2,234 other ranks had served in the AFC, and another 200 men had served as aircrew in the British flying services. Casualties included 175 dead, 111 wounded, 6 gassed and 40 captured. The AFC was disbanded after the war, being replaced in 1920 by the Australian Air Corps, which became the Royal Australian Air Force in 1921.

== Royal Australian Navy operations ==
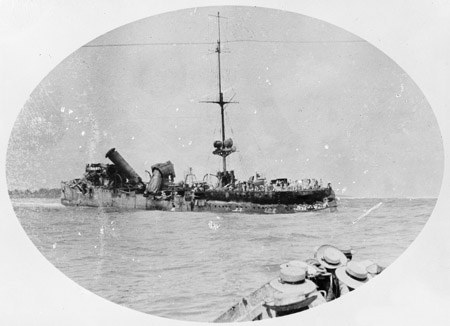
A broadside view of the wrecked German raider Emden

At the outbreak of war the Royal Australian Navy consisted of the battlecruiser HMAS Australia, the light cruisers Sydney, Melbourne and Brisbane (under construction), the destroyers Parramatta, Yarra and Warrego, and the submarines AE1 and AE2. Three more destroyers were also under construction. The Squadron was under the command of Rear Admiral Sir George E. Patey, a British admiral who was knighted on the deck of the Australia before it departed England in 1913.

The first naval operation of the war was in support of the Australian Naval and Military Expeditionary Force during the occupation of German New Guinea. The naval portion of the force included the Australia, Melbourne, Sydney, Warrego, Encounter, and submarine AE1. The only loss during the New Guinea Campaign occurred when the AE1 disappeared on 14 September 1914, taking three officers and 32 men with it.

The first major RAN victory of the war occurred when the cruiser, HMAS Sydney sank the German light cruiser, SMS Emden off the Cocos Islands in the Indian Ocean on 9 November 1914. Four Australians were killed in the engagement and another 12 were wounded. Ships of the RAN helped provide naval cover for the ambitious landings at Gallipoli, and the submarine AE2 broke the blockade of the Dardanelles to harass Turkish shipping but was later sunk and her crew captured in the Sea of Marmara.

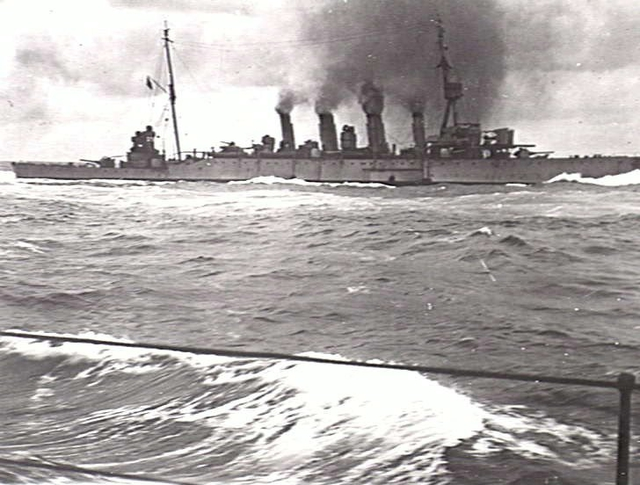
HMAS Melbourne operating with the Grand Fleet in 1918. She is carrying a Sopwith Camel on her forward six-inch gun turret.

In 1915 the light cruisers Melbourne and Sydney were deployed to the Atlantic where they worked alongside the Royal Navy's North American and West Indies Squadrons, which were engaged in surveillance operations on the many German ships that had taken refuge in neutral American ports when the war had broken out. This continued until September 1916 when both cruisers were moved to the North Sea where they joined Australia, which had been assisting the Royal Navy in its blockade of the German High Seas Fleet.

During this time the RAN also continued to carry out operations in the Pacific and Indian Oceans. By 1915 there were up to 74 German ships which had taken refuge in ports in the Netherlands East Indies. The presence of these ships close to Australia and the sea lanes that connected the nation to the United Kingdom and the Middle East was a cause of concern to the Navy and so in the middle of 1915 the cruiser HMAS Psyche and the sloop Fantome were sent to the Bay of Bengal to conduct patrol operations. Later in the year, in October, a force of three destroyers, a yacht and the cruiser Encounter were sent into the Macassar Strait to search for a German munitions base that had been reported in the area. Nothing was found, although the patrol served to interrupt German efforts to carry out subversive activities in several British possessions.

In May 1917 the British government requested assistance from the Australian government in dealing with the increasing threat posed by German U-boats. Six destroyers—the Warrego, Parramatta, Yarra, Swan, Torrens and Huon—were sent in response to this request, and undertook anti-submarine operations in the Adriatic, working out of Brindisi, Italy as part of the Otranto Barrage.

The most decorated RAN unit of the war was the Bridging Train. A reserve unit commanded by Lieutenant Commander Leighton Bracegirdle, it supported the British at Suvla Bay during the Gallipoli Campaign by constructing piers and harbours in the bay. Afterwards it served in Egypt and Palestine, taking part in an amphibious assault in El Arish and the First Battle of Gaza before it was disbanded in 1917. Some members later went on to serve with the AIF and RAN. During the war the RAN lost 171 men killed, including 15 officers and 156 sailors, of which six officers and 57 sailors had been on loan from the Royal Navy.

== Home front ==
=== Australian Military Forces on home service ===
Although the main focus of Australia's military during World War I was overseas in Europe and the Middle East, there was still a necessity to maintain troops in Australia on home service to carry out essential tasks. As the AIF was otherwise engaged these duties out of necessity fell to the soldiers of the militia and a few regular soldiers. In the early stages of mobilisation several militia infantry battalions were called out to carry out guard duties upon infrastructure that was considered important to the war effort, such as munitions factories, communications facilities, ammunition dumps and transportation centres. 500 men from the Kennedy Regiment were sent to Thursday Island from Townsville to garrison the island in response to a possible threat from German forces in the Pacific. Militia troops were also used to establish and guard internment camps and garrison artillery and engineer units from the militia were also mobilised to assist the regular units that were manning coastal defences.

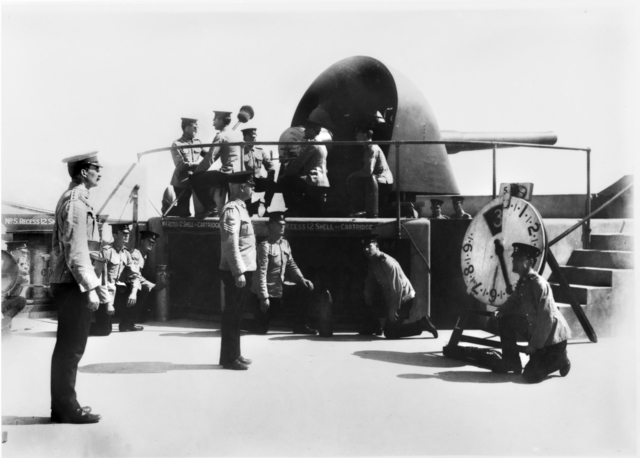
A six-inch gun at Fort Nepean in August 1914. This gun fired Australia's first shot of the war when the German merchant ship SS Pfalz attempted to escape from Port Phillip Bay on 5 August 1914.

By the end of 1914 the naval situation in the Pacific had eased to a large extent due to the sinking of the Emden, and it was decided that there was no longer a need to maintain guards on many of the less important facilities, and instead it was decided to concentrate the home defence network upon maintaining the coastal defences and on guarding ships while they were in port. In the larger seaports these precautions required the commitment of considerable resources, requiring several hundred men to provide security. The requirement for the militia to undertake these duties was eased when a special corps was raised from men that had been rejected for service with the AIF, to which a corps of garrison military police that had served in the AIF was added later.

The militia garrison artillery and engineers were required throughout the war to man the coastal defences. Despite the fact that after 1915 it was decided that only small garrisons were required on active service, the militia was ordered to maintain their readiness in case they were required to be called out and such was the importance placed upon their role that to a large extent they were barred from joining the AIF for overseas service. In February 1916 a large-scale effort by militia artillerymen to enlist in the artillery units that were being raised for the 3rd Division was prevented when they were called out to man the coastal defences due to the threat posed by a German commerce raider that was believed to be in the Pacific. This mobilisation lasted until April 1916, when the garrisons were again reduced and the ban on men serving in militia artillery and engineer units volunteering for overseas service was lifted.

In April 1918 the militia artillery was again mobilised, although this time only for a month, when news that the German commerce raiders Wolf and Seeadler had entered Australian waters the previous year. In June 1918 the number of troops actively employed on home service was 9,215, of which 2,476 were regulars. At this time the Navy took over the task of providing guards for ships in harbour and communications facilities, thus allowing for many of the militia troops to be released for further training, and as such it was decided to increase the period of camp training for the militia from eight days to 24.

=== Conscription ===
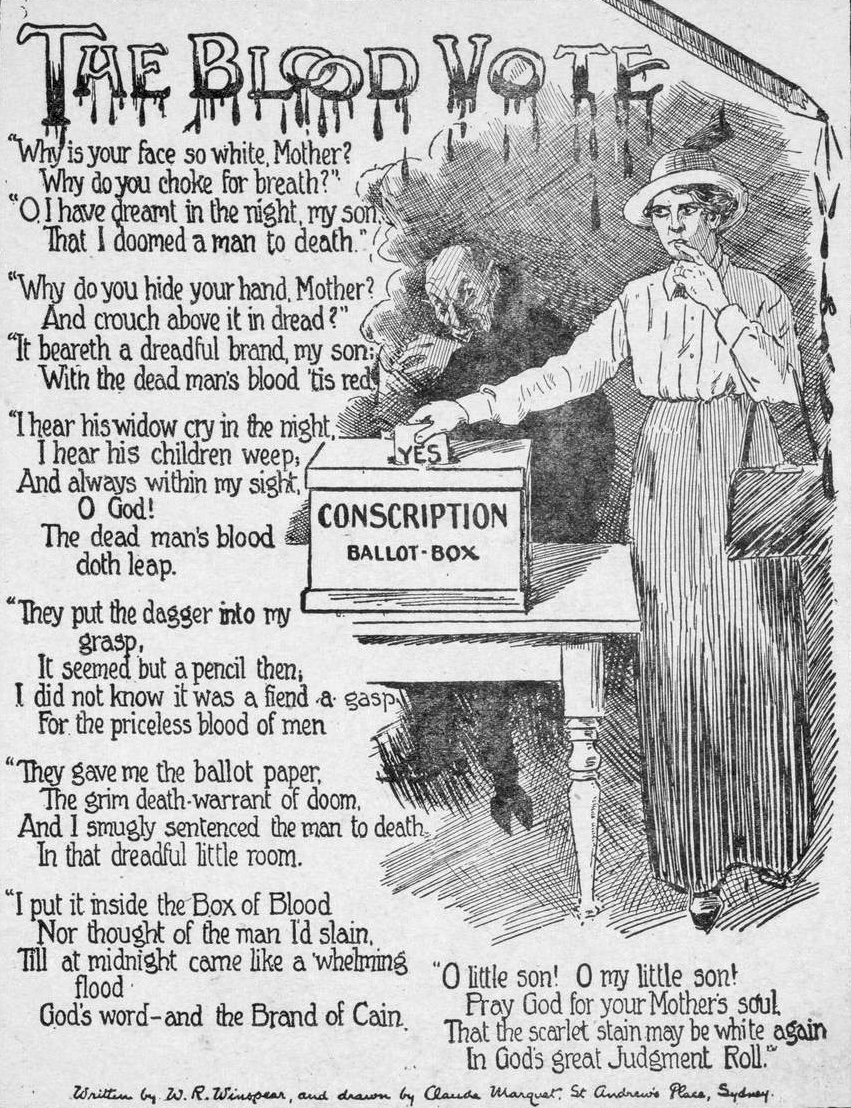
An anti-conscription handbill poem issued before the 1917 plebiscite

Throughout World War I the Australian forces deployed overseas were all volunteers, but on the home front there was considerable debate about the issue of conscription. Conscription had been a contentious issue ever since Federation and when the AIF was initially raised in 1914 it had been decided that it would be an all-volunteer force due to the provisions of the Defence Act that precluded sending conscripts overseas. As the war progressed, casualties among the deployed forces began to reach alarming rates and as the flow of reinforcements and recruits for the AIF began to drop in 1916, the issue of conscription rose once more.

In Australia, public opinion regarding the matter was divided; many Australians opposed to the issue on moral grounds, feeling that the situation was not desperate enough to require such a drastic measure, but others felt it necessary to achieve final victory. The Hughes Labor government decided to hold a plebiscite on the matter and on 28 October 1916 the matter was decided by a narrow margin of 51 per cent to 49 per cent, the no vote prevailing. Despite the result, the issue split the Labor Party and the pro-conscription prime minister, Billy Hughes, ultimately left the party and joined with members of the opposition that supported conscription to form a new party, known as the Nationalist Party.

As manpower shortages on the Western Front began to become acute, a second plebiscite was held on 20 December 1917. This time it was defeated by an even greater margin of 94,152 votes. This effectively put an end to plans to expand the AIF in France and ultimately led to severe manpower shortages that the AIF in France experienced in 1917 and 1918. As a result, plans to expand the force to a 6th Division were shelved and its manpower distributed among the other five divisions; the five divisions were amalgamated together under the banner of the Australian Corps, thus effectively allowing the 4th Division, which was struggling to maintain its numbers to act as a depot formation within the Corps with the other three divisions providing most of the combat power.

As the war continued, the manpower shortages continued. Wounded men were being pressed back into service, and there were cases of "combat refusal" by the 1st and 59th Battalions. On 23 September 1918, Monash ordered the breakup of some under-strength battalions to reinforce others. In the AIF the battalion was the source of pride and identification for the men, rather than the regiment as in the British Army, so in some cases this order was defied – some men, who were not eligible to draw rations as their unit no longer officially existed, lived by stealing food or sharing with other units. Monash rescinded the order for a while but eventually "the Heads" (as Australians called their senior officers) enforced the change by marching off companies by night into different battalions. The change ultimately proved unnecessary as the war ended shortly after.

=== Internment, censorship and other special measures ===
The global nature of the war meant that many functions that were previously vested in the individual Australian state governments had to be placed under the control of the Commonwealth government. The exigencies of the war meant also that the government required the power to enact certain laws that under the Constitution it would not normally be able to do. To enable this, the War Precautions Act 1914 was introduced in October 1914, providing the Commonwealth government with wide-ranging powers for a period of up to six months after the duration of the war.

The main provisions of the Act were focused upon allowing the Commonwealth to enact legislation that was required for the smooth prosecution of the war. The main areas in which legislation was enacted under the War Precautions Act were: the prevention of trade with hostile nations, the creation of loans to raise money for the war effort, the introduction of a national taxation scheme, the fixing of the prices of certain goods, the internment of people considered a danger to the war effort, the compulsory purchase of strategic goods, and the censorship of the media.

At the outbreak of the war there were about 35,000 people who had been born in either Germany or Austria-Hungary living in Australia. Due to large-scale German migration in the late 19th century, there were also an inestimable number of people of German origin, many of whom maintained an affinity for their ancestral roots. Many of these were naturalised Australians, and it is believed that many men of German origin enlisted in the AIF. Owing to concerns about the loyalties of some members of the German and Austrian communities, internment camps were set up where those suspected of unpatriotic acts were sent. In total it is believed that 4,500 people were interned under the provisions of the War Precautions Act, of which 700 were naturalised Australians and 70 Australian-born. Following the end of the war, 6,150 were deported.

There was a considerable public backlash to the way in which some of the provisions of the War Precautions Act were applied, particularly in relation to certain sections of the community such as trade unions and other sections of the community that were not as sympathetic to the British cause as the wider community. Indeed, in 1917, following the suppression of a prominent trade union and the jailing of 12 of its members on charges of sedition and sabotage, it seemed as if Australia's war effort might have been in danger of breaking down.

After the war, the continued operation of the War Precautions Act led to considerable social and political unrest in late 1918 and into 1919 and several violent incidents broke out. The most notable of these was the so-called Red Flag Riots in Brisbane, in 1919.

=== Economy ===
The Australian Honour Flag, awarded to subscribers of the Australian Government's 7th War Loan in 1918

At the outset of the war, Australia's economy had been quite small and dependent largely upon agriculture and the resources industries for export earnings, and most manufactured products were imported from overseas. Almost immediately uncertainty over the continuation of foreign trade led to a rise in unemployment, indeed it was estimated that after only a couple of days of Britain having declared war, that up to 15,000 men had been retrenched in New South Wales alone due to concerns about the continued availability of foreign markets for Australian produce.

These initial concerns were short lived, at least in the beginning as the British government provided assurances that it would underwrite a large amount of the war risk insurance for shipping to allow trade among the Commonwealth to continue. Shortly thereafter the wartime direction of trade began when the British asked the Australian government to place certain restrictions upon overseas trade to secure resources vital to the war effort and to limit the ability of the Central Powers from obtaining these goods from Commonwealth nations via neutral third parties. To an extent these restrictions served to reduce the ability of Australian producers to find buyers for their products, at least initially, but in many cases the British stepped in to buy these goods, thus alleviating Australian concerns about a significant reduction in the standard of living. This understanding proved particularly beneficial for the wool and wheat industries; the British government undertook to buy Australian products even though the shortage of shipping meant that there was no chance that they would ever receive them.

On the whole Australian commerce was expanded due to the war, although the cost of the war was quite considerable and the Australian government had to borrow considerably from overseas to fund the war effort. In terms of value, Australian exports rose almost 45 per cent; the number of Australians employed in the manufacturing industry increased over 11 per cent. This was due in the most part to the reduced ability of traditional sources to continue supplying Australia with manufactured products, which out of necessity stimulated the development of the Australian manufacturing industry.

In terms of goods produced indigenously, it was estimated that due to the inability of traditional suppliers to deliver manufactured goods because of trade embargoes and shipping shortages up to 400 new articles were produced in Australian factories as a result of the war. This was not an insignificant number, although the transformation of the Australian economy as a result of World War I was by no means as significant as that which occurred during World War II. The expansion of the steel industry that occurred during this time laid the foundation for future industrialisation.

Despite this increase in the domestic manufacturing industry there was still a significant shortfall in many items. In part this was due to the priority that military consumption and production necessarily had over civilian, but there was also a considerable scarcity of raw materials and other components required for manufacturing. This was due both to the lack of shipping available from the United Kingdom, as well as the limitations placed upon the flow of such goods from Britain due to their own increased requirements. The result of this was inflationary. Domestic prices went up, but the cost of exports was deliberately kept lower than market value in an effort to prevent further inflationary pressures worldwide. As a result, the cost of living for many average Australians was increased considerably.

An increase in the trade union movement was an inevitable corollary of this and during the war years there was a considerable increase in the membership. (Note: Between 1914 and 1919 the number of Australian workers who were members of trade unions rose by 104,314.) Despite the considerable rises in the costs of many basic items, the government sought to maintain wages largely as they were. Although the average weekly wage during the war was increased by between 8–12 per cent, it was not enough to keep up with inflation and as a result there was considerable discontent among workers, to the extent that industrial action followed. Not all of these disputes were due to economic factors, and indeed in some part they were the result of violent opposition to the issue of conscription, which many trade unionists were opposed to. The result was very disruptive and it has been estimated that between 1914 and 1918 there were 1,945 industrial disputes, resulting in 8,533,061 working days lost and £4,785,607 in lost wages.

Overall, the war had a significantly negative impact on the Australia economy. Real aggregate Gross Domestic Product (GDP) declined by 9.5 per cent over the period 1914 to 1920, and the mobilization of personnel resulted in a 6 per cent decline in civilian employment. Meanwhile, although population growth continued during the war years, it was only half that of the prewar rate. Per capita incomes also declined sharply, falling by 16 per cent.

== After the war ==
=== Repatriation and demobilisation ===
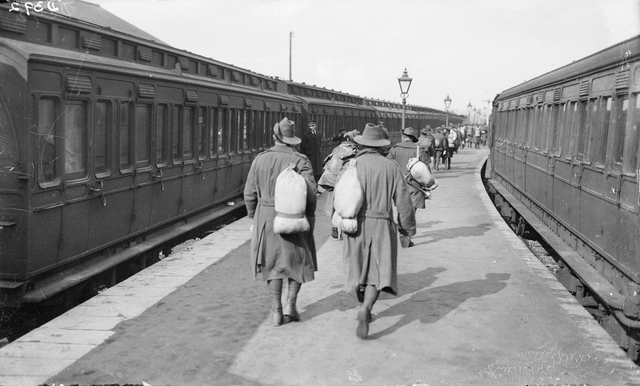
AIF troops just landed at Weymouth in England from France entraining for repatriation depots in April 1919

Following the end of hostilities in Europe the Australian government decided against contributing Australian forces to the occupation forces that were sent to Germany as part of the post war settlement so that it could begin the repatriation of the AIF early. Lieutenant General Sir John Monash was appointed Director-General of Repatriation and Demobilisation and oversaw the process in Britain, and Lieutenant General Henry Chauvel took charge of the efforts in the Middle East.

Rather than employing a system that returned men by units, or by employment categories, it was decided to use an egalitarian system that saw men who had been away for the longest period of time being returned first. Due to the size of the forces deployed overseas—roughly 167,000 personnel in France, Britain and Egypt—and the logistical requirements of bringing them home the process was a lengthy one and as such it became important to occupy the troops while they waited. To achieve this and to prepare the men for a return to civilian employment, a vocational education scheme was set up by George Long and troops in Britain were offered educational courses and civilian work placement opportunities and although these programs were not as successful as hoped, several thousand soldiers took advantage of them.

Some Australians decided to delay their departure and instead joined the British Army and went on to serve in Northern Russia during the Russian Civil War, although officially the Australian government refused to contribute forces to the campaign. HMAS Yarra, Torrens, Swan and Parramatta served in the Black Sea during the same conflict. Elsewhere, in Egypt in early 1919, several Australian light horse units were used to quell a nationalist uprising while they were waiting for passage back to Australia. Despite shortages in shipping, the process of returning the soldiers to Australia was completed faster than expected and by September 1919 there were 10,000 men still left in Britain waiting for repatriation. The last of the main transports conveying Australian troops left England on 23 December 1919, arriving in Australia in early 1920. A year later, on 1 April 1921, the AIF was officially disbanded.

The process of repatriation did not end there, though. Upon their return to Australia the effort shifted towards placing the returned soldiers into employment, or education and taking care of those that were too badly injured to work. To meet these needs the Commonwealth established the Repatriation Department, tasked with managing the placement of returned soldiers into employment, training, education, housing. Eventually this also included the colossal task of managing the provision of war pensions, managing repatriation hospitals and convalescent homes and administering the Soldier Settlement Scheme. The total cost of these provisions was considerable, and in June 1935 it was estimated to have cost approximately £238,000,000 which was more than the total amount spent on defence during the war.

To advocate for the many thousands of returned servicemen and women many ex-services organisations sprang up. The most prominent of these was the Returned Sailors and Soldiers Imperial League of Australia which had been established in 1916 by representatives from many state-based organisations already in existence. Following the war this organisation grew in its political influence as its numbers grew and was very active in the repatriation process, advocating for financial entitlements for veterans and securing concessions for soldiers returning to civilian employment. By 1919 it had about 150,000 members although this fell dramatically in the mid-1920s.

=== Legacy ===
The war affected Australia in many ways, although arguably not as greatly as it did the many European nations that were more directly involved. Economically the war had significant impacts, although the Great Depression would later prove far more significant and Australian industry was not as greatly transformed as it would be following World War II. The political landscape was also transformed due to the rifts that resulted from the issue of conscription, and to a smaller extent the role of women in society also evolved as more women entered the workforce. Between 1914 and 1918 there had been a 13 per cent increase in the employment of women; this was mainly in areas where women were traditionally employed. Although around 2,000 women were employed as nurses in the AIF, there was no great involvement of women in the military during the war.

Another legacy was the manner in which it led to the emergence—albeit only fleetingly—of an independence in Australian foreign affairs. Although previously Australian foreign interests had been largely handled by Britain, as a combatant Australia sent its own delegation to the Paris Peace Conference in 1919, and it also began to take a more assertive role in regional affairs in the Pacific. At the peace conference Prime Minister Hughes pushed aggressively for reparations and an Australian mandate over German New Guinea; a stance which conflicted with the liberal internationalist inspired Fourteen Points put forward by American President Woodrow Wilson. Regardless, following the war there was little real change in Imperial relations and Dominion affairs, and as a result the war arguably did not lead to any significant change in Australia's perception of its role in the world. Indeed, profound change would only occur following the Japanese crisis of 1942, which ultimately saw Australia pursue a foreign policy more independent of Britain, and an alliance with the United States.

Perhaps the greatest effect of the war was a psychological one. Many veterans joined the Returned Sailors and Soldiers Imperial League of Australia, which later became the Returned and Services League of Australia, with a strong ethos of mateship, compassion, and service. It became a right wing force that cooperated with the Nationalist Party of Prime Minister Stanley Bruce and lobbied for veterans' benefits such as medical care, pensions, and support services.

The heavy losses deeply affected many directly, and war memorials were built all over the country as people sought to remember those that had been killed. Charles Bean, who was instrumental in editing and writing the official history of Australia's involvement in the war, advocated the need for a national memorial and was one of the main architects in establishing the Australian War Memorial in Canberra.

The experience of the war also reshaped the Australian character and national identity in ways that endure to this day. The memory of the failed Gallipoli campaign highlighted the nation's emergence as a member of the international community, while bringing to the fore a belief in Australians' natural ability as soldiers. Veterans of Gallipoli remembered the battle in a fashion that was consistent with the popular "digger" stereotype of Australians with the emphasis being on the bravery, toughness, stubbornness, and "mateship". A few elderly veterans were interviewed again in the 1970s-1980s during which they remembered the Battle of Gallipoli in a completely different manner with the emphasis being on the squalor and horror of the battle with many of the veterans recalling that they were terrified. The British historian John Tosh argued that the stories told by Australian veterans of Gallipoli reflected what the Australian public wanted to hear at different times, namely tales of the brave "diggers" battling it out in the face of overwhelming odds in the interwar era and tales of a horrific battle in the post-Vietnam era.

The attitudes of many Australians towards war itself were also greatly affected. There was a widespread revulsion at the large-scale destruction and loss of life that had occurred and a desire that it should never occur again. In many regards this led to a general avoidance of defence and military needs and deepened the nation's lack of preparedness for the next major conflict. (Note: Such notions remain common in Australian society today, although their impact upon the formulation of defence policy may have been limited by the development of a standing, professional force after World War II. Evans 2005 provides a discussion of the impact of the conflict between traditional Australian notions of social nationalism and military professionalism, as well as the way in which the ideals of ANZAC have led to Australian strategic complacency.)

== Statistics ==
During World War I over 421,809 Australians served in the military with 331,781 serving overseas. Over 60,000 Australians lost their lives and 137,000 were wounded. (Note: These casualties can be broken down as follows: 53,993 battle-related deaths; 7,727 non-battle related deaths; 137,013 wounded in action; 16,496 gassed; 3,647 prisoners of war and 109 prisoner of war deaths.) As a percentage of forces committed, this equalled a casualty rate of almost 65 per cent, one of the highest casualty rates among the British Empire forces. The financial cost of the war to the Australian government was £188,480,000.

== See also ==
- Australian Army battle honours of World War I
- List of Australian diarists of World War I
