= Toma, Papua New Guinea =

Town in East New Britain Province, Papua New Guinea

Coordinates: 4°23′0″S 152°10′0″E

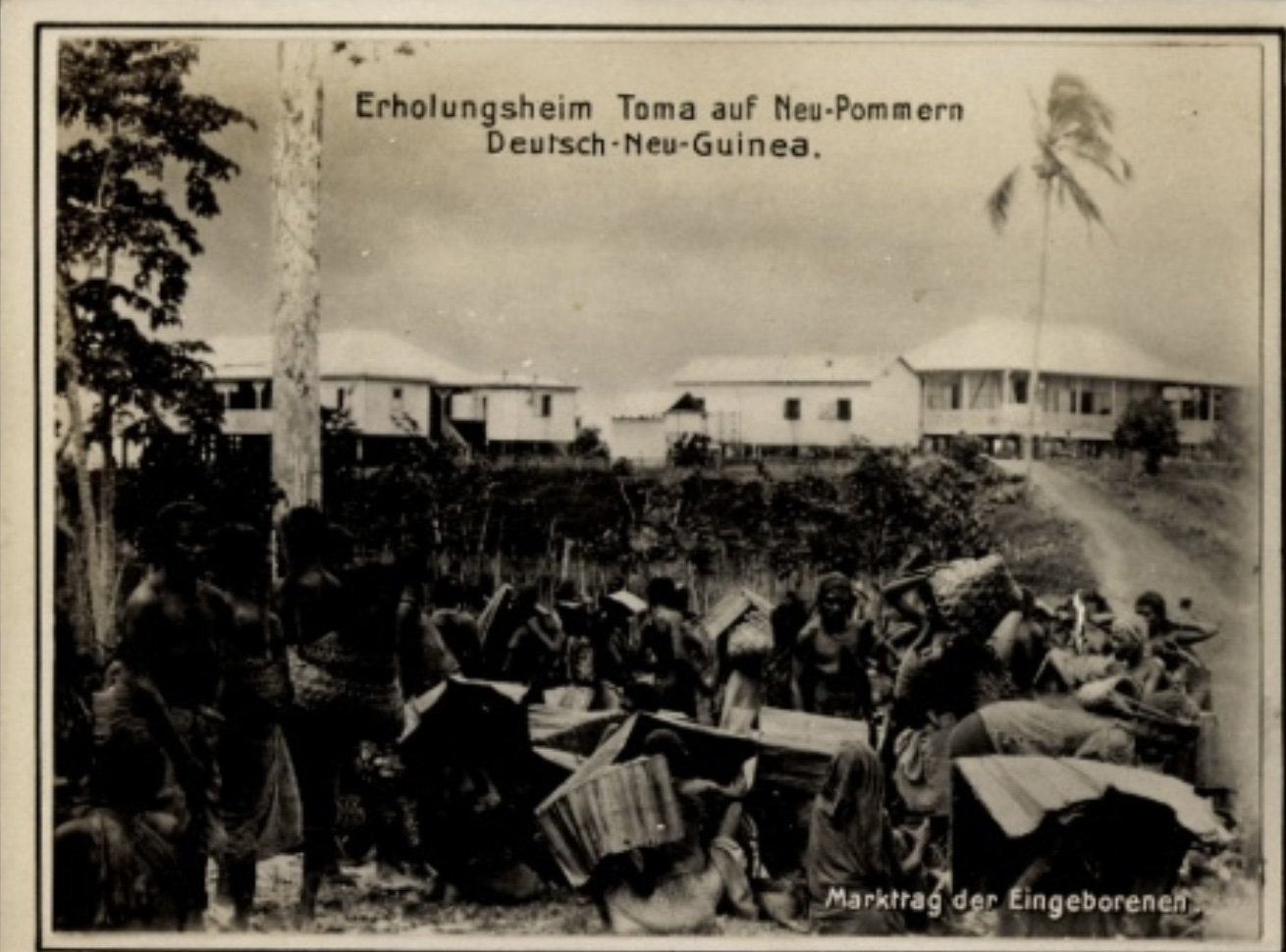
Toma Recreation Center, postcard image circa 1910

Toma is a town located on the Gazelle Peninsula in East New Britain province, Papua New Guinea. It is located in Vunadidir-Toma Rural LLG.

== History ==
The Siege of Toma occurred between Australian and German Empire troops between 14–17 September 1914 during World War I.
