= Siege of Toma =

Bloodless action during World War I on the island of New Pomerania

Coordinates: 4°23′0″S 152°10′0″E

- Part of the Australian occupation of German New Guinea
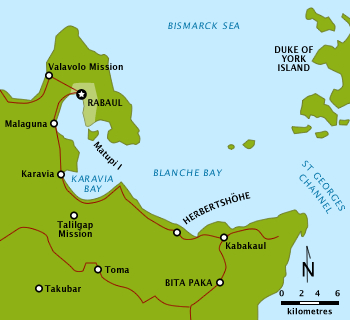
- Map showing the area between Toma and Rabaul, 1914.
| Date | 14–17 September 1914 (3 days) |
| Location | Toma, outside Rabaul on New Pomerania, German New Guinea |
| Result | Australian victory |

Belligerents
| Australia | German Empire |

Commanders and leaders
| Edward Martin | Eduard Haber (surrendered) |

Strength
| Land: 200 infantry, 1 artillery piece Sea: 1 protected cruiser | 40 infantry, 110 policemen |

Casualties and losses
| None | 150 captured |

The siege of Toma was a bloodless action during the First World War on the island of New Pomerania (now New Britain) between 14 and 17 September 1914 as part of the occupation of German New Guinea by the Australian Naval and Military Expeditionary Force (AN&MEF). Australian forces had been dispatched to seize and destroy German wireless stations in the south-west Pacific because they were used by the German East Asian Cruiser Squadron of Vice Admiral Maximilian von Spee which threatened merchant shipping in the region. New Zealand provided a similar force for the occupation of German Samoa. Ultimately the German colonial government was forced to surrender after being surrounded, ending the last significant resistance in the territory.

== Prelude ==
The Australian Naval and Military Expeditionary Force (AN&MEF) reached Rabaul on 11 September, finding the port free of German forces. Small parties of naval reservists landed at Kabakaul and Herbertshöhe on Neu-Pommern, southeast of Rabaul. These parties were reinforced firstly by sailors and later by infantry and proceeded inland to capture the radio station believed to be in operation at Bita Paka, 4.3 miles (6.9 km) to the south. The Australians were resisted by a mixed force of German reservists and Melanesian native police, who forced them to fight their way to the objective. By nightfall the radio station was reached, and it was found to have been abandoned, the mast dropped but its instruments and machinery intact. During the fighting at Bita Paka seven Australians were killed and five wounded, while the defenders lost one German NCO and about 30 Melanesians killed, and one German and ten Melanesians wounded. At nightfall on 12 September, the AN&MEF infantry battalion was landed at Rabaul. The following afternoon, a ceremony was carried out to signal the British occupation of New Britain despite the fact that the German governor had not surrendered the territory.

== Siege ==
Meanwhile, after their defeat at Bita Paka on 11 September the remaining German forces retreated 19 miles (31 km) to Toma, believing they would have time to recuperate before the Australians arrived. Unknown to the Germans however, an advanced party of 200 Australians, under command of Major Edward Martin, had followed them from Bita Paka and surrounded the town, proceeding to bombard it with a 12-pound field piece. The protected cruiser HMAS Encounter also arrived on the scene, and fired several shells at a ridge nearby. The German governor, Eduard Haber, knew his small force would eventually have to surrender but continued to hold out for several days hoping that the German East Asia Squadron would arrive to relieve them. Nevertheless, the show of Australian firepower was sufficient to start negotiations, forcing Haber to realise that his hopes were futile. The Germans subsequently made favourable terms with the Australians, surrendering the colony and ending the siege. Terms were signed on 17 September and all military resistance ceased, with the remaining 40 German soldiers and 110 natives surrendering on 21 September. Haber was allowed to return to Germany while German civilians could remain as long as they swore an oath of neutrality. Those who refused were transported to Australia from where they could freely travel back to Germany.

== Aftermath ==
With the government's surrender, nearly all of German New Guinea came under Australian control. The majority of the Germans living there were interned and later deported. Only a few isolated bands of German forces continued to resist after the fall of Toma. By 1915, the only remaining German resistance in the colony besides the occasional merchant raider was Leutnant Hermann Detzner and his band of 20 native police who evaded capture in the interior of New Guinea for the entire war. Following the capture of German possessions in the region, the AN&MEF provided occupation forces for the duration of the war.

== See also ==
- Military history of Australia during World War I
