= Edward Fowell Martin =

Australian general

- Born: 22 August 1875; Launceston, Tasmania
- Died: 22 September 1950 (aged 75); Perth, Western Australia
- Military career
- Allegiance: Australia
- Branch: Australian Army
- Service years: 1898–1921
- Rank: Brigadier General
- Commands: 6th Brigade (1920–21); 5th Brigade (1918–19); 17th Battalion (1916–18)
- Conflicts: First World War; Asian and Pacific theatre; Siege of Toma; Gallipoli Campaign; Battle of Hill 60; Western Front; Battle of Pozières; Battle of the Menin Road Ridge; Battle of Mont Saint-Quentin; Battle of St Quentin Canal
- Awards: Companion of the Order of the Bath; Companion of the Order of St Michael and St George; Distinguished Service Order; Mentioned in Despatches (6)
- Other work: Sergeant-at-arms of the Western Australian Legislative Assembly

Brigadier General Edward Fowell Martin, CB, CMG, DSO (22 August 1875 – 22 September 1950) was an Australian accountant, public servant, and a senior Australian Army officer who served in the First World War.

== Early life and career ==
Edward Fowell Martin was born in Launceston, Tasmania, on 22 August 1875. The family moved to New South Wales where Martin was educated at King's College, Goulburn. He worked as an accountant in a bank before joining a woolbroking firm. Martin joined the Army Service Corps as a private in 1898. He was commissioned in 1903 and reached the rank of major on 1 August 1913.

== First World War ==
On 18 August 1914 Martin joined the Australian Naval and Military Expeditionary Force (AN&MEF). The force sailed for New Guinea on HMAS Berrima. On 14 September 1914 he led the advance on Toma, where the German acting governor had established his headquarters. After the German surrender, Martin landed at Madang with a half company of infantry and a half company of naval reservists for a garrison and took charge there. He was District Administrator until February 1915, after which he returned to Australia where his appointment to the AN&MEF was terminated on 4 March 1915.

On 7 May 1915 Martin joined the Australian Imperial Force as a major in the 17th Battalion. The battalion left for Egypt on 12 May 1915, and Martin became second in command of the battalion on 2 June. The battalion arrived at Anzac on 19 August where it was committed to the Battle of Hill 60, taking many casualties. In September the battalion took over at Quinn's Post. Martin contracted dysentery and was evacuated to Egypt on 13 September. He returned on 8 December, just before the evacuation.

The 17th Battalion departed Alexandria for Marseille on 23 March 1916. Martin was appointed to command the 17th Battalion with the rank of lieutenant colonel on 19 April in place of Lieutenant Colonel Henry Arthur Goddard, who had been evacuated to Australia sick. The 17th Battalion was committed to Pozières in July and took heavy casualties. The battalion remained in the line, participating in the capture of the Pozières. For his performance—and that of his battalion at Pozières, Martin was mentioned in despatches and awarded the Distinguished Service Order (DSO).

Martin was evacuated with the flu on 23 December 1916, returning to the 17th on 17 February 1917. During the German counterattack at Lagnicourt in April, Martin's headquarters was caught up in the fighting. At Menin Road on 20 September, he moved it into a shell hole in the front line so as to better supervise the defence effort. Martin was mentioned in despatches twice more in 1917 and he was made a Companion of the Order of St Michael and St George (CMG). Martin was made a brevet lieutenant colonel in the AMF on 24 September 1917.

On 9 March 1918 Martin assumed temporary command of the 7th Brigade and was promoted to temporary colonel on 29 March. He relinquished command on 3 May and immediately took over command of the 5th Brigade. On 28 June the position became permanent and Martin became a temporary brigadier general. He was promoted to colonel in the AMF on 9 July.

On 31 August 1918 the 5th Brigade took Mont St Quentin; the capture of Mont St Quentin by the men of the 2nd Division was widely regarded as the finest fighting feat of the war. For his part in the 1918 fighting, Martin was mentioned in despatches three more times and was made a Companion of the Order of the Bath (CB) on 3 June 1919. He left for Australia on 12 July, arriving in Sydney on 26 August. He appointment to the AIF was terminated on 8 December.

== Post-war ==
In 1924 Martin moved to Perth where he became an accountant with The West Australian newspaper. In 1932 he was appointed sergeant-at-arms of the Western Australian Legislative Assembly. He carried the mace for the next eighteen years. During the Second World War he helped organise the Volunteer Defence Corps in Perth. He died on 22 September 1950.

== See also ==
- List of Australian generals
