= 1st Light Car Patrol (Australia) =

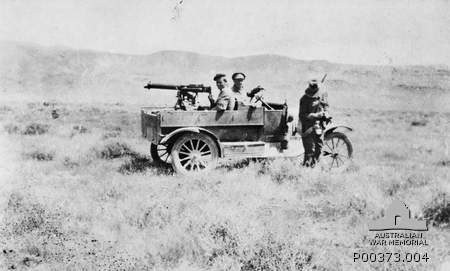
- Model T Ford Utility manned by Australian soldiers and armed with Vickers .303 machine gun mounted on a tripod
- Active: 1916–1919
- Country: Australia
- Branch: Australian Army
- Type: Armoured car
- Role: Patrol
- Part of: Australian Imperial Force
- Colors: Blue and white
- Engagements: World War I: Sinai and Palestine Campaign

Insignia
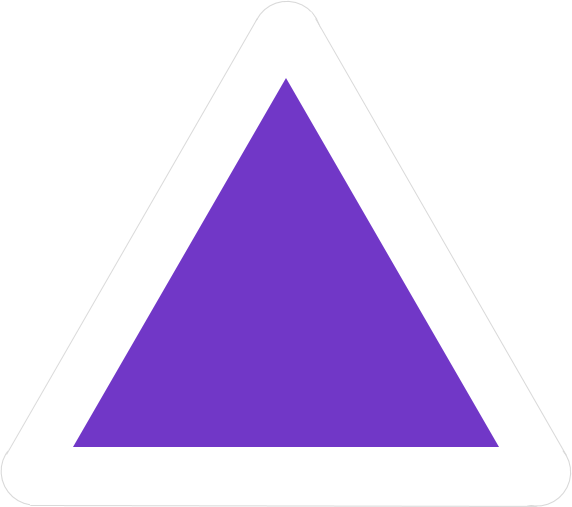
- Unit colour patch

The 1st Light Car Patrol was formed in Melbourne in June 1916, and designated the 1st Armoured Car Section; it was also known as the 1st Armoured Car Battery. The patrol was disbanded in 1919 as repatriation of soldiers was underway.

== History ==
The unit was raised in Melbourne during 1916 as part of the Australian Imperial Force during World War I, and left for Egypt in June of the same year. The unit fought against the Senussi in the Sudan and Western Desert. The 1st Armoured Car Section became the 1st Light Car Patrol on 3 December. As their original three vehicles became worn out from hard use in the Western Desert and were irreparable due to shortages of spare parts, the unit was reequipped with six Ford light cars. Extra drivers and motorcycles were provided. The cars were given names: Anzac, Billzac, Osatal, Silent Sue, Imshi and Bung. These were traded in for six new Fords on 11 December 1917.

In May 1917 the unit was redeployed to Palestine by rail, and served throughout the campaign there. Like similar British units of the Egyptian Expeditionary Force it was used to conduct long range reconnaissance and patrol duties, often operating well in advance of forward cavalry units. By November 1918 they had reached Aleppo with the British Indian 5th Cavalry Division, where they were believed to be the furthest advanced Australian unit at the conclusion of the campaign.

== Equipment ==
The 1st Light Car Patrol was equipped with three armoured cars built at the Vulcan Engineering Works in South Melbourne, a 50 hp (37 kW) Daimler, a 60 hp (45 kW) Mercedes and a 50 hp (37 kW) Minerva. All were armoured, with the Daimler and Mercedes models armed with Colt machine guns.

== Sources ==
- Bou, Jean (2010). Australia's Palestine Campaign. Australian Army Campaign Series. Vol. 7. Canberra, Australian Capital Territory: Army History Unit. ISBN 9780980810004.
