= Imperial Camel Corps Memorial =

War memorial in London

- United Kingdom
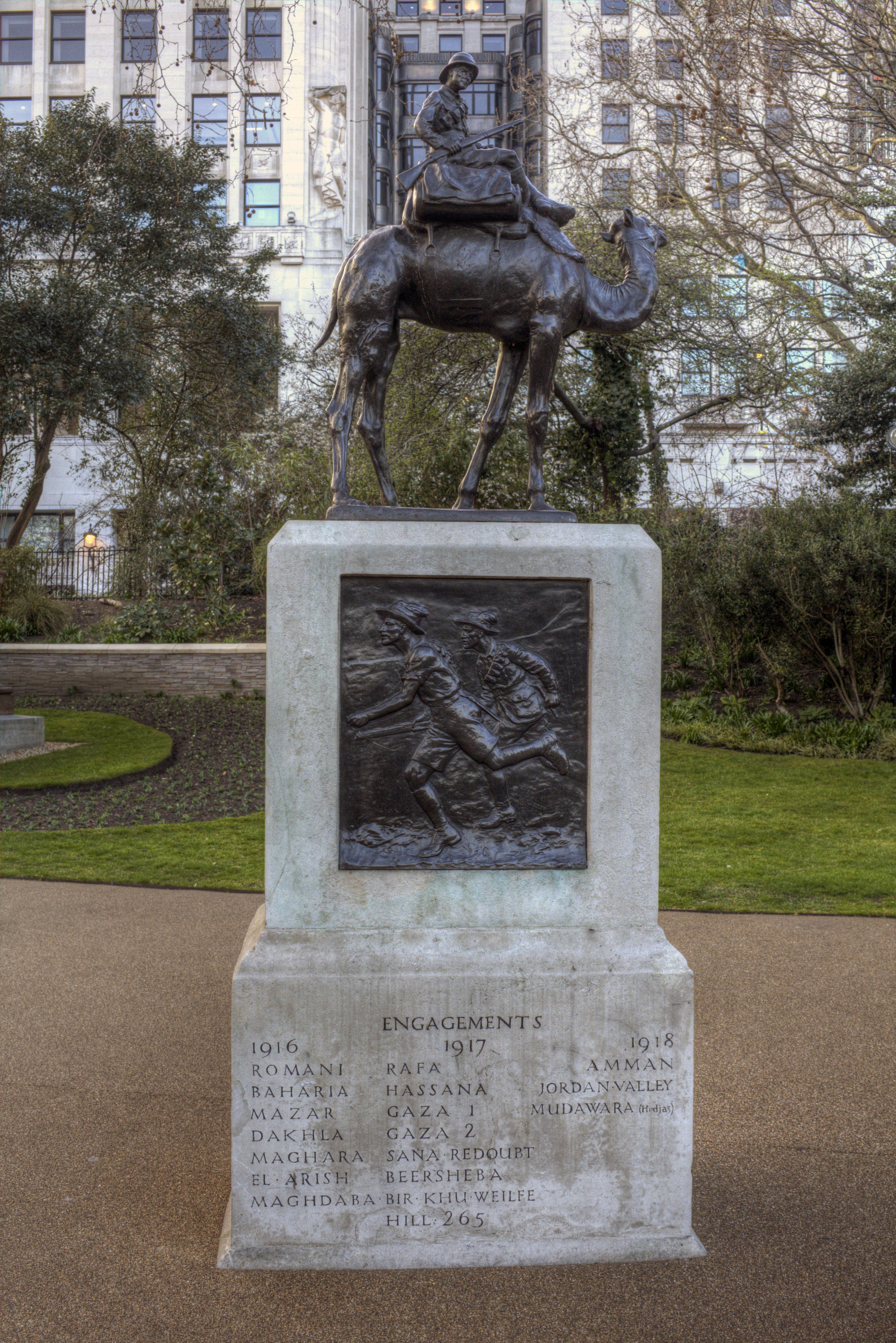
- The sculpture in 2015
- For Imperial Camel Corps
- Established: July 22, 1921
- Location: 51.508499°N 0.121671°W; Victoria Embankment Gardens near London
- Designed by: Major Cecil Brown

Burials by nation
- 191 from Australia, 106 from the UK, 41 from New Zealand, and 9 from India
- To the Glorious and Immortal // Memory of the Officers, N.C.O.s and Men // of the Imperial Camel Corps – British, // Australian, New Zealand, Indian – who fell in action or died of wounds // and disease in Egypt, Sinai, and Palestine, 1916, 1917, 1918

The Imperial Camel Corps Memorial is an outdoor sculpture commemorating the Imperial Camel Corps, located in Victoria Embankment Gardens, on the Thames Embankment to the east of Charing Cross station, in London, England. The unit of mounted infantry was created in December 1916 from troops that had served in the Gallipoli campaign in the Dardanelles.

The memorial was sculpted by Major Cecil Brown, who served in the Corps, with bronze elements cast by A.B. Burton at his Thames Ditton Foundry. It comprises (considerably smaller than life-size) a bronze statue of a man riding a camel, on a Portland stone pedestal with bronze panels on its four sides. Two bronze plaques list the names of all 346 men who died while serving with the Corps in Egypt, Sinai and Palestine between 1916 and 1918: 191 from Australia on the east plaque, and 106 from the UK, 41 from New Zealand, and 9 from India on the west plaque. The bronze plaque to the south depicts two soldiers running, and that to the north depicts two officers next to a camel. Below the bronze plaque, the north face of the stone plinth bears a dedication:

To the Glorious and Immortal // Memory of the Officers, N.C.O.s and Men // of the Imperial Camel Corps – British, // Australian, New Zealand, Indian – who fell in action or died of wounds // and disease in Egypt, Sinai, and Palestine, 1916, 1917, 1918.

The south face is inscribed with a list of the engagements of the Corps:

- 1916: Romani, Baharia, Mazar, Dakhla, Maghara, El. Arish, Maghdaba
- 1917: Rafa, Hassana, Gaza 1, Gaza 2, Sana Redoubt, Beersheba, Bir Khu Weilfe, Hill 265
- 1918: Amman, Jordan Valley, Mudawar (Hedjaz)

Lieutenant-General Sir Philip Chetwode, who was the first commander of the Desert Mounted Corps, unveiled the memorial on 22 July 1921. The Bishop of London, Arthur Winnington-Ingram, delivered the dedication.

The memorial received a Grade II listing in 1958. Westminster City Council restored the memorial in 1999.
