= Raid on Bir el Hassana =

Raid in 1917

Coordinates: 30.467°N 33.78°E

- Part of the Middle Eastern theatre of World War I
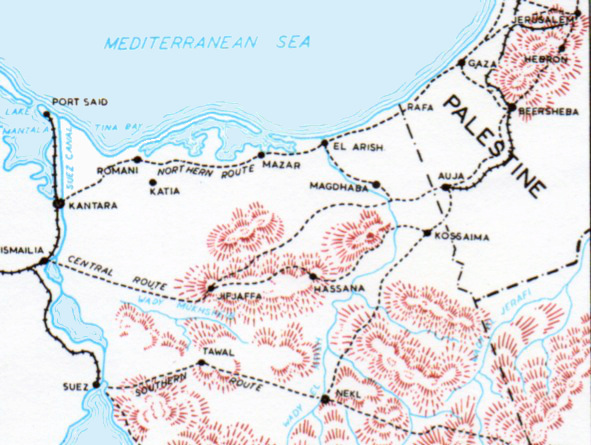
- Map of Sinai Peninsula
Date	13–21 February 1917 (1 week and 1 day)
Location	Central Sinai Peninsula
Result	British Empire victory

Belligerents
United Kingdom and Empire: Egypt; Australia; India	(Ottoman Empire) Ottoman Empire; Sinai Bedouin

Commanders and leaders
(British Empire) Major J.R. Bassett	Unknown

Units involved
2nd Battalion (British), Imperial Camel Corps; Hong Kong and Singapore (Mountain) Battery	

Strength
Unknown	22 Ottoman troops plus armed Bedouins

Casualties and losses
1 wounded	22 prisoners

The Raid on Bir el Hassana (Hasna) occurred in the Sinai Peninsula in February 1917, during World War I. It was a minor action between an augmented battalion of the Imperial Camel Corps on the one side and a score of Turkish troops plus some armed Bedouin on the other. The raid occasioned the first aeromedical evacuation in the British Army.

The raid was the third of three actions fought by British forces seeking to recapture the Sinai Peninsula during the Sinai and Palestine Campaign of World War I. Egyptian Expeditionary Force (EEF) cavalry and camels travelled into the centre of the Sinai Peninsula to attack and push the last Turkish garrisons back into Palestine.

== Background ==
British ships on the Mediterranean coast and the Gulf of Aqaba guarded the coast road via El Arish, and the road from Ma'an via Nekhl to the Suez Canal. Ottoman forces continued to occupy the area on the central way across the Sinai south from el Kossaima towards the Suez Canal, including Bir el Hassana and Nekhl.

== The raid ==
General Archibald Murray, commander of the Egyptian Expeditionary Force, ordered attacks against both Nekhl and Bir el Hassana, which lay 40 miles (64 km) north of Nekhl, between the Gebel Helal and the Gebel Yelleg. Three columns of cavalry and camelry set out with the goal of all attacking on 18 February. One column set out from Serapeaum (possibly the vicinity of Ismailia), and another from Suez on 13 February 1917, to converge on Nekhl. Major J.R. Bassett, commanding 2nd Battalion (British), Imperial Camel Corps, together with the Hong Kong and Singapore (Mountain) Battery, marched from El Arish, via Magdhaba.

This column reached Lahfan on the 16th, and on the 17th, advanced from Magdhaba. At dawn the next morning they surrounded the Ottoman Army garrison at Bir el Hassana, which consisted of three officers and 19 other ranks, reinforced by armed Bedouin. The Ottoman troops surrendered, but the Bedouin fired on the British, shattering Lance Corporal McGregor's ankle. One of the Turks who surrendered was Nur Effendi, who had commanded the garrison at the unsuccessful British attack on Maghara on 15 October 1916. The troops searched Bir el Hassana and found 21 rifles, a few camels, and 2100 rounds of ammunition.

After the surrender of Bir el Hassana, Bassett's force remained in position to capture any Ottoman force withdrawing back from Nekhl towards Bir el Hassana.

== Aeromedical evacuation ==
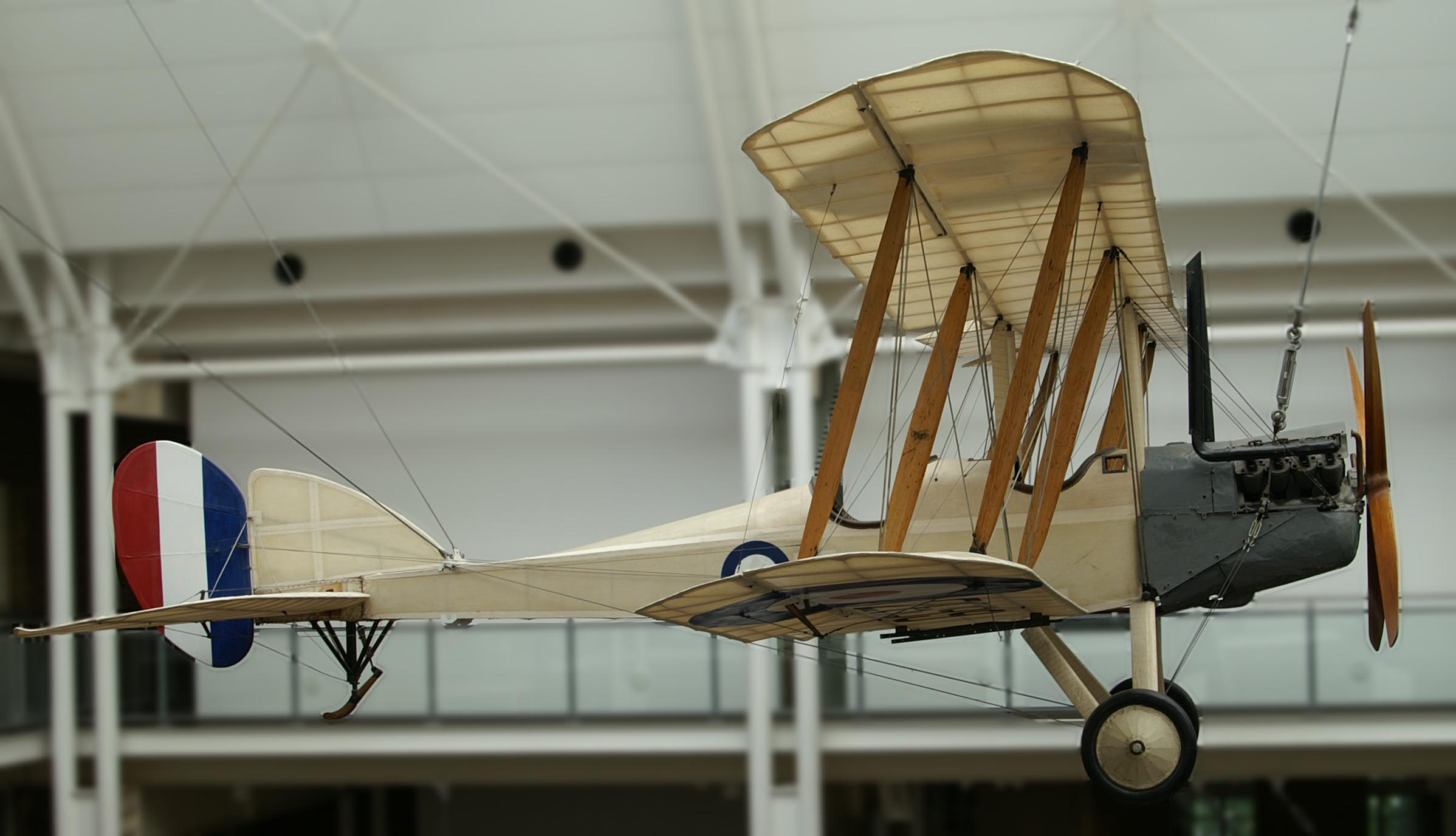
A B.E.2c at the Imperial War Museum in London.

On 19 February the Royal Flying Corps flew McGregor out with his leg in a box splint, while he sat in the observer's seat of a Royal Aircraft Factory B.E.2c, a two-seater biplane. This was the first use of aeromedical evacuation by the British. The flight to El Arish took 45 minutes. The alternative to aeromedical evacuation was a cacolet (a type of litter) on a camel, which one historian described as "a form of travel exquisite in its agony for wounded men because of the nature of the animal's movement". Travel by cacolet would have taken days.

== See also ==
- First Battle of Gaza
- Battle of Rafa
