= Cacolet =

Cacolet may refer to:

- Camel cacolet, for field transport of wounded soldiers
- Mule cacolet, ditto
- Cacolet, journal of the Australian Camel Field Ambulance (see Australian Army Medical Units, World War I)
- Tricoche et Cacolet, a notable 19th Century French fictional detective team
- Caçolet, meaning cassoulet
