= Imperial Camel Corps =

British Imperial camel-mounted infantry brigade of WWI

Imperial Camel Corps Brigade
- A posed photograph of Australian, British, New Zealand and Indian Camel Corps troopers
- Active: January 1916 – May 1919
- Country: British Empire
- Branch: Army
- Type: Brigade
- Role: Camel-mounted Infantry
- Size: 4,150 men and 4,800 camels
- Part of: Egyptian Expeditionary Force
- Equipment: camel
- Engagements: First World War: Senussi campaign; Sinai and Palestine campaign; Arab Revolt (Note: A full list of the corps' battles and engagements is in the aftermath section.)

Commanders
- Notable commanders: Clement Leslie Smith VC

Insignia

The Imperial Camel Corps Brigade (ICCB) was a camel-mounted infantry brigade that the British Empire raised in December 1916 during the First World War for service in the Middle East.

From a small beginning the unit eventually grew to a brigade of four battalions, one battalion each from Great Britain and New Zealand and two battalions from Australia. Support troops included a mountain artillery battery, a machine gun squadron, Royal Engineers, a field ambulance, and an administrative train.

The ICC became part of the Egyptian Expeditionary Force (EEF) and fought in several battles and engagements, in the Senussi Campaign, the Sinai and Palestine Campaign, and in the Arab Revolt. The brigade suffered 246 men killed. The ICC was disbanded in May 1919 after the end of the war.

== Formation ==
=== Background ===
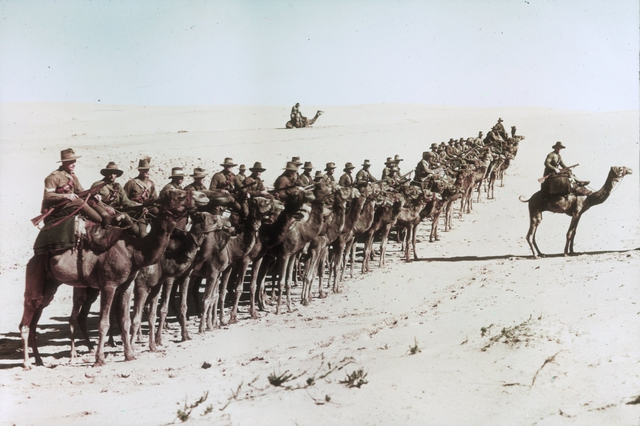
Australian camel company

The advantages of camels in a desert environment are well known, and the British Army had raised the Somaliland Camel Corps in 1912. However the British Army forces serving in Egypt at the start of the First World War did not possess their own camel formation. The first units of what became the Imperial Camel Corps were four company-sized formations that conducted long-range patrols around the Suez Canal and the Sinai Desert. The companies were raised in Egypt in January 1916 from Australians returning from the failed Gallipoli Campaign. The Indian princely state of Bikaner supplied the first camels as the Bikaner Camel Corps already used camels. These camels were later only used as draught animals and the lighter Egyptian camel became the mount chosen for carrying troops. The camels could cover an average distance of 3 miles (4.8 km) an hour, or 6 miles (9.7 km) an hour trotting, while carrying a soldier, his equipment, and supplies.

The camel companies consisted of a small headquarters and four sections, each of seven groups of four men. The establishment of a company was 130 men, all armed with Lee–Enfields, the standard British bolt action rifle of the time. However the move from patrol to a more active combat role in August 1916 led to a re-organisation. Each company added a machine-gun section of fifteen men with three Lewis guns; the company headquarters also received extra staff. All this increased company strength to 184 men. The four companies were expected to operate as independent units that travelled by camel but then dismounted to fight as infantrymen. Following the practise of cavalry and mounted infantry units, one man of each group of four held the camels when the team was in action, which reduced a team's firepower by a quarter. However it was soon discovered that camels were not as nervous as horses when faced with artillery and rifle fire, and one man would look after twelve to sixteen camels once the troopers had dismounted.

In March 1916 six new companies were raised from British yeomanry regiments. Then in June another four Australian companies were raised from reinforcements intended for the Australian Light Horse regiments. Reinforcements from New Zealand intended for the New Zealand Mounted Rifles Brigade formed two companies, one created in August and the second in November.

=== Brigade ===
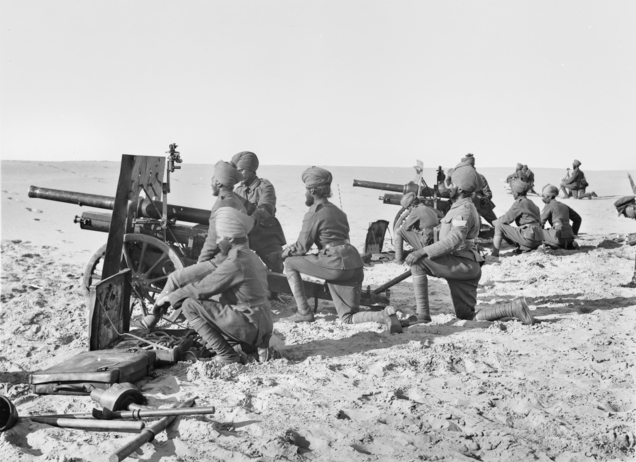
The Hong Kong and Singapore (Mountain) Battery

The Imperial Camel Brigade was formed on 19 December 1916, under the command of Brigadier General Clement Leslie Smith VC. The brigade originally comprised three battalions, 1st (Australian), 2nd (British), and 3rd (Australian), plus supporting units. (Note: The second battalion was also known as the 2nd (Imperial) Battalion.) Each of the battalions had an authorised strength of 770 men and 922 camels. A battalion comprised four companies and a headquarters. The 4th (ANZAC) Battalion was raised in May 1917, but instead of increasing the brigade fighting strength, it was decided one battalion would always be resting and refitting, while three battalions served at the front.

To complete the brigade structure and supply added firepower, the brigade received some other units: the 265th (Camel) Machine Gun Squadron, with eight Vickers machine guns, and the Hong Kong and Singapore (Mountain) Battery, armed with six BL 2.75 inch Mountain Guns. Despite their title, the battery was formed by men from the British Indian Army. The brigade also had its own Royal Engineers (the 10th (Camel) Field Troop), a signal section, the Australian (Camel) Field Ambulance, and the 97th Australian Dental Unit, which with only four men was the brigade's smallest unit. The brigade included the ICC Mobile Veterinary Section, and the brigade's logistic units were the ICC Brigade Ammunition Column and the ICC Brigade Train, which carried enough supplies for five days. The total brigade strength was around 4,150 men and 4,800 camels.

== Operational history ==
=== 1916 ===
==== Battalions ====
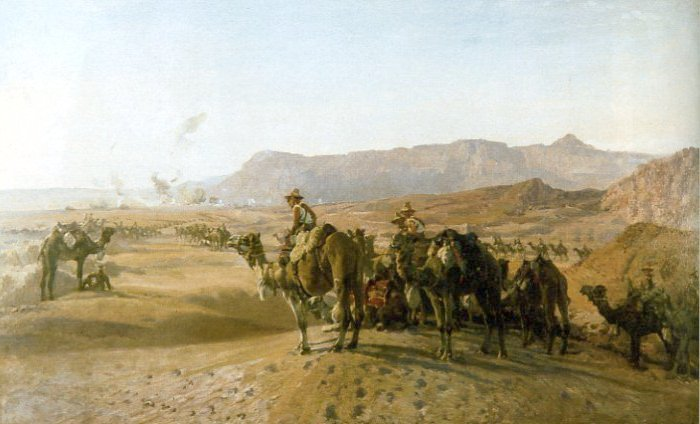
Imperial Camel Corps at the Battle of Magdhaba

In March 1916, after two months of training, the first camel patrols left their depot at Abassi on the outskirts of Cairo to patrol the Libyan Desert. In 1915 the Senussi had attacked British and Egyptian outposts along the Suez Canal and the Mediterranean coast. The resulting Senussi Campaign was largely over by then, but the patrols were to show the Senussi that the British were watching them, and to protect the border areas.

Around the same time long-range patrols, each of about thirty men, went into the south and south-east of the Sinai desert to detect any Ottoman incursion into the area. When the patrols discovered Ottoman outposts, the brigade organized a company-strength raid against the outposts. The ICC undertook similar patrols in the north to protect the rail and water lines, which were vital for any British attack.

==== Brigade ====
The Egyptian Expeditionary Force (EEF) went over to the offensive in the Sinai Desert in August, winning the Battle of Romani. In support of these operations in December the brigade moved into the Sinai; their first large battle came during the Battle of Magdhaba on 23 December, two days after the brigade was formed.

=== 1917 ===
On 9 January 1917 the ICC was involved in another victory during the Battle of Rafa, which forced the Ottomans to withdraw the Sinai outposts towards Gaza. This also reduced the need for independent camel patrols across the Sinai; in May the EEF consolidated the now-surplus companies into a new unit, the 4th (ANZAC) Battalion.

The intensity of operations grew and the ICC were next involved in the capture of the Turkish force at Bir el Hassana, (Note: The 2nd Battalion of the ICC, together with the Hongkong and Singapore Mountain Battery marched some 30 miles from El Arish, surprising the Turkish forces at Bir el Hassana, who surrendered without resistance. Some local Bedouin fired on the British, who suffered one casualty, a soldier who was shot in the ankle. Because he could no longer ride, the British evacuated him by aeroplane, in the first recorded case of aeromedical evacuation.) the defeats during the First Battle of Gaza in March, and the Second Battle of Gaza in April and a raid on the Sana redoubt in August. They then had a break to refit. Subsequently, they participated in the victories in the Battle of Beersheba, the Third Battle of Gaza, and at the Battle of Mughar Ridge during October and November. By the end of the year the advance had crossed the Sinai and entered Palestine.

=== 1918 ===
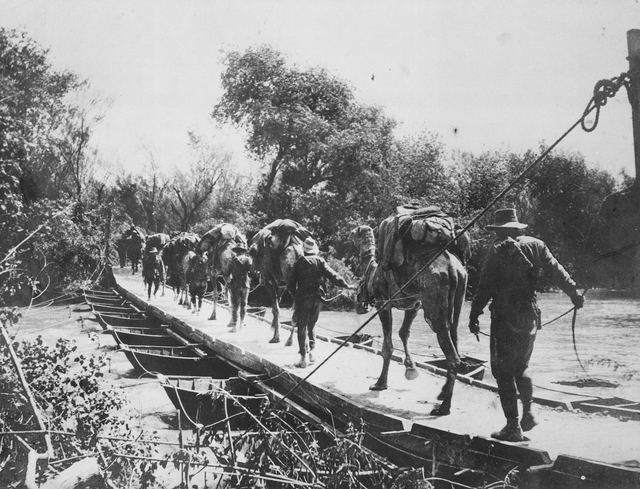
ICC troops crossing the River Jordan to attack Amman April 1918

Early in 1918, the ICC moved to the area of the Jordan valley and took part in the attack in March and April. The First Battle of Amman was unsuccessful; after three days of battle the British were unable to break through the Ottoman defences around the city and had to withdraw. The 4th (Anzac) Battalion did succeed in capturing Hill 3039 overlooking the city and managed to hold out for twenty-four hours in the face of artillery and infantry attacks, until ordered to withdraw.

During the Second Transjordan attack on Shunet Nimrin and Es Salt, the camel brigade were assigned the western defence of the Jordan River ford at Umm esh Shert defending the left flank of the 4th Light Horse Brigade. The camel brigade was unable to support the light horsemen, which were attacked on the left flank and forced to withdraw.

When the EEF advanced out of the Sinai and into Palestine, the change in terrain led to the disbandment of the ICC. In June 1918, the Australian troops were used to form the 14th and 15th Light Horse Regiments. The New Zealand troops formed the 2nd New Zealand Machine Gun Squadron. All three units became part of the 5th Light Horse Brigade. The six British companies remained part of the ICC for a while longer. Two of them fought with T. E. Lawrence in the Arab Revolt, and in July 1918 carried out operations sabotaging the Hejaz railway line. However, no reinforcements were assigned and the six remaining companies were reduced in strength to two before they were eventually disbanded in May 1919. Brigadier-General Claude Stuart Rome took over as Colonel of the corps in June 1918.

== Aftermath ==
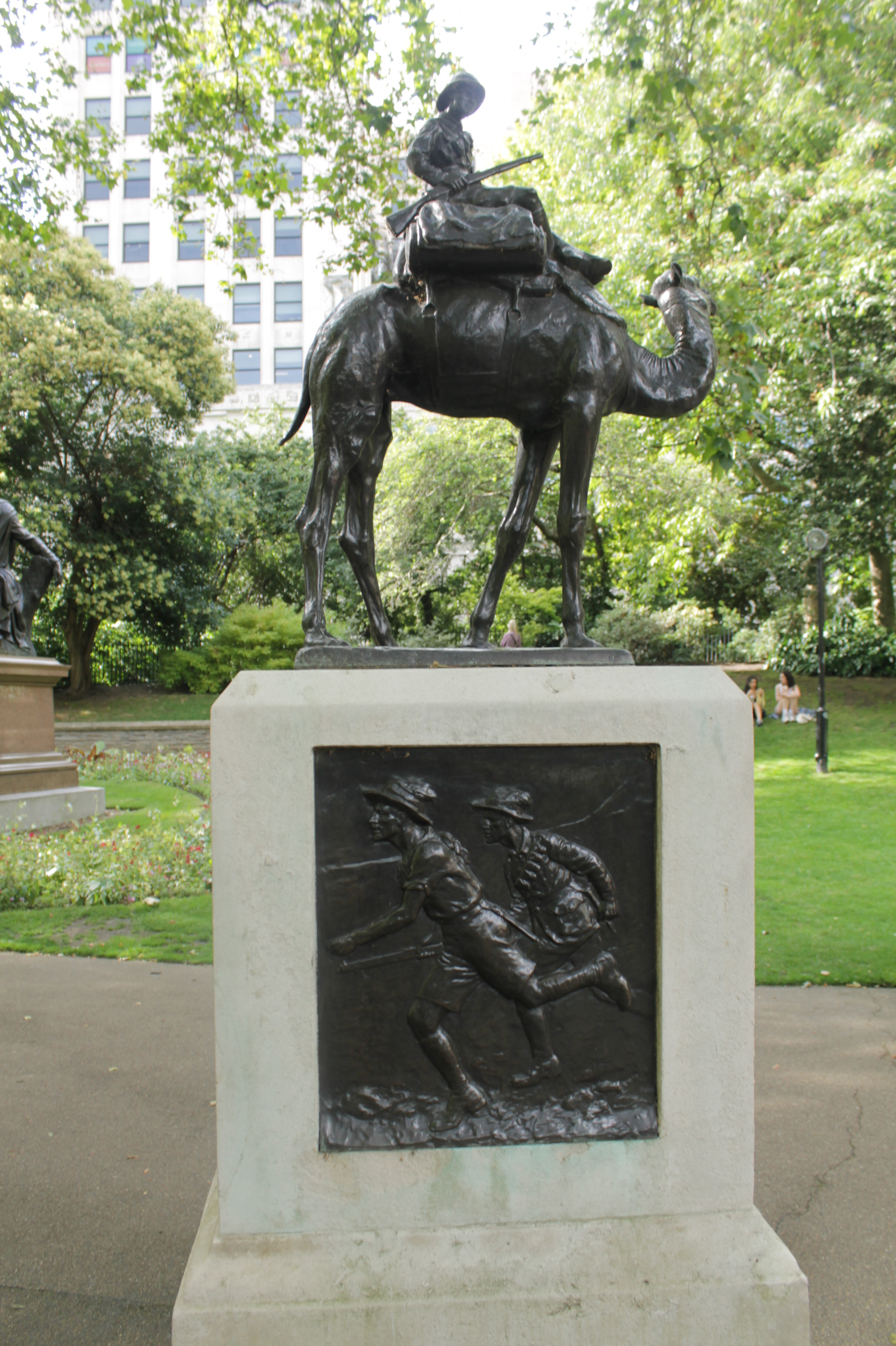
Memorial to the Imperial Camel Corps, Victoria Embankment Gardens, London

Over two years of service cost the ICC 240 deaths: 106 British, 84 Australians, 41 New Zealanders, and 9 Indians. A memorial to the Imperial Camel Corps was unveiled on the 22 July 1921, on the Thames Embankment in London. On one side it is inscribed with the names of all the members of the corps who died during the war, while on the front is the sentiment;

To the Glorious and Immortal Memory of the Officers, N.C.O.s and Men of the Imperial Camel Corps – British, Australian, New Zealand, Indian – who fell in action or died of wounds and disease in Egypt, Sinai, and Palestine, 1916, 1917, 1918.

The monument also lists all the battles and engagements fought by the corps;

- 1916: Romani, Baharia, Mazar, Dakhla, Maghara, El. Arish, Maghdaba
- 1917: Rafa, Hassana, Gaza 1, Gaza 2, Sana Redoubt, Beersheba, Bir Khu Weilfe, Hill 265
- 1918: Amman, Jordan Valley, Mudawar (Hedjaz)

== Order of battle ==
The strength of the brigade/corps in the field was around 3,380 men and 3,880 camels, with one battalion resting.

- Brigade Headquarters (40 men)
- 1st (Australian) Battalion (770 men)
- 2nd (British) Camel Battalion (770 men)
- 3rd (Australian) Camel Battalion (770 men)
- 4th (ANZAC) Camel Battalion (770 men)
- Hong Kong and Singapore (Mountain) Battery (255 men)
- 265th (Camel) Machine Gun Squadron (115 men)
- 10th (Camel) Field Troop, Royal Engineers (71 men)
- Signal Section, ICC Brigade (30 men)
- Australian (Camel) Field Ambulance (185 men)
- 97th Australian Dental Unit (4 men)
- ICC Mobile Veterinary Section (42 men)
- ICC Brigade Ammunition Column (75 men)
- ICC Brigade Train (245 men)

== Works cited ==
- Clayton, Anthony; Killingray, David (1989). Khaki and Blue: Military and Police in British Colonial Africa. Africa series. Vol. Monographs in International Studies, Volume 51. Ohio University Center for International Studies. ISBN 978-0-89680-147-9.
- Falls, Cyril; G. MacMunn (1930). Military Operations Egypt & Palestine from the Outbreak of War with Germany to June 1917. Official History of the Great War Based on Official Documents by Direction of the Historical Section of the Committee of Imperial Defence. Vol. 1. London: HM Stationery Office. OCLC 610273484.
