= Clement Leslie Smith =

British Army officer

Brigadier-General Clement Leslie Smith VC MC
- Born: 17 January 1878; Romsey, Hampshire, England
- Died: 14 December 1927 (aged 49); Alassio, Italy
- Burial place: English Cemetery, Alassio
- Military career
- Allegiance: United Kingdom
- Branch: British Army
- Service years: 1900–?
- Rank: Brigadier-General
- Units: Duke of Cornwall's Light Infantry
- Commands: Imperial Camel Corps Brigade
- Conflicts: Fourth Somaliland Expedition; Second Boer War; First World War
- Awards: Victoria Cross; Military Cross; Mentioned in Despatches; Order of the Nile (Egypt)

Brigadier-General Clement Leslie Smith, VC, MC (17 January 1878 – 14 December 1927) was a British Army officer and a recipient of the Victoria Cross, the highest award for gallantry in the face of the enemy that can be awarded to British and Commonwealth forces.

== Military career ==
Smith was commissioned into the Duke of Cornwall's Light Infantry as a second lieutenant on 5 May 1900, and the following year served in South Africa as a Railway Staff officer during the Second Boer War. After the end of the war (in June 1902), he was promoted to lieutenant on 9 August 1902, and left South Africa for England on the SS Simla in October that year.

=== Details on Victoria Cross ===
Smith was 25 years old, serving in the 2nd Battalion, Duke of Cornwall's Light Infantry, attached to the 5th Somaliland Light Infantry during the Fourth Somaliland Expedition when the following deed took place for which he was awarded the VC.

On 10 January 1904 at the commencement of the fight at Jidballi, British Somaliland, Lieutenant Smith and a medical officer tried to rescue a hospital assistant who was wounded. The rapidity of the enemy's fire, however, made this impossible and the hospital assistant was killed. Lieutenant Smith then did all that was possible to bring out the medical officer, helping him to mount a horse and, when this was shot, a mule. This animal also was shot and the medical officer was killed, but the lieutenant stayed with him to the end, trying to keep off the enemy with his revolver.

=== Later career ===
Smith, promoted on 26 October 1911 to captain, and to major on 8 January 1916 later advanced to the rank of brigadier general. During the First World War he commanded the Imperial Camel Corps Brigade based in Egypt.

On 10 September 1921 he transferred as a substantive lieutenant colonel to the Duke of Wellington's Regiment.

== The medal ==
His Victoria Cross is displayed at the Duke of Cornwall's Light Infantry Museum in Bodmin, Cornwall, England.
