= Battle of Rafa =

1917 battle during the Sinai and Palestine Campaign of World War I

Coordinates: 31.265°N 34.235°E

Battle of Rafah
- Part of the Middle Eastern theatre of World War I
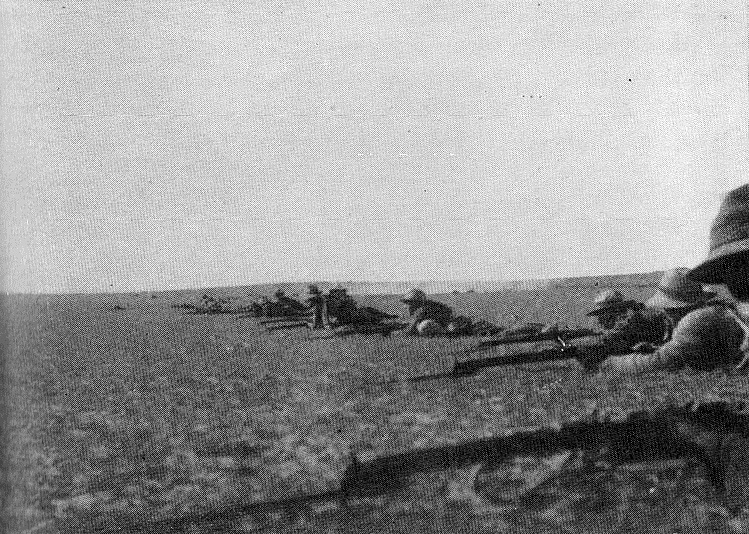
- Part of the British Empire firing line at Rafa
Date	9 January 1917
Location	Sinai–Palestine border
Result	British victory

Belligerents
United Kingdom: India; Rhodesia; Australia; New Zealand	Ottoman Empire

Commanders and leaders
(United Kingdom of Great Britain and Ireland) Philip Chetwode	(Ottoman Empire) Unknown

Strength
Desert Column; ANZAC Mounted Division; Imperial Camel Corps Brigade; 7th Light Car Patrol	Ottoman garrison of 2,000 soldiers

Casualties and losses
71 killed, 415 wounded	200 killed, 168 wounded, 1,434 prisoners

The Battle of Rafa, also known as the Action of Rafah, fought on 9 January 1917, was the third and final battle to complete the recapture of the Sinai Peninsula by British forces during the Sinai and Palestine campaign of the First World War. The Desert Column of the Egyptian Expeditionary Force (EEF) attacked an entrenched Ottoman Army garrison at El Magruntein to the south of Rafah, close to the frontier between the Sultanate of Egypt and the Ottoman Empire, to the north and east of Sheikh Zowaiid. The attack marked the beginning of fighting in the Ottoman territory of Palestine.

After the British Empire victories at the Battle of Romani in August 1916 and the Battle of Magdhaba in December, the Ottoman Army had been forced back to the southern edge of Palestine as the EEF pushed eastwards supported by extended lines of communication. This advance depended on the construction of a railway and a water pipeline. With the railway reaching El Arish on 4 January 1917, an attack on Rafa by the newly formed Desert Column became possible. During the day-long assault, the Ottoman garrison defended El Magruntein's series of fortified redoubts and trenches on rising ground surrounded by flat grassland. They were eventually encircled by Australian Light Horsemen, New Zealand mounted riflemen, mounted yeomanry, cameliers and armoured cars. In the late afternoon, the New Zealand Mounted Rifles Brigade captured the central redoubt and the remaining defences were occupied shortly afterwards.

== Background ==
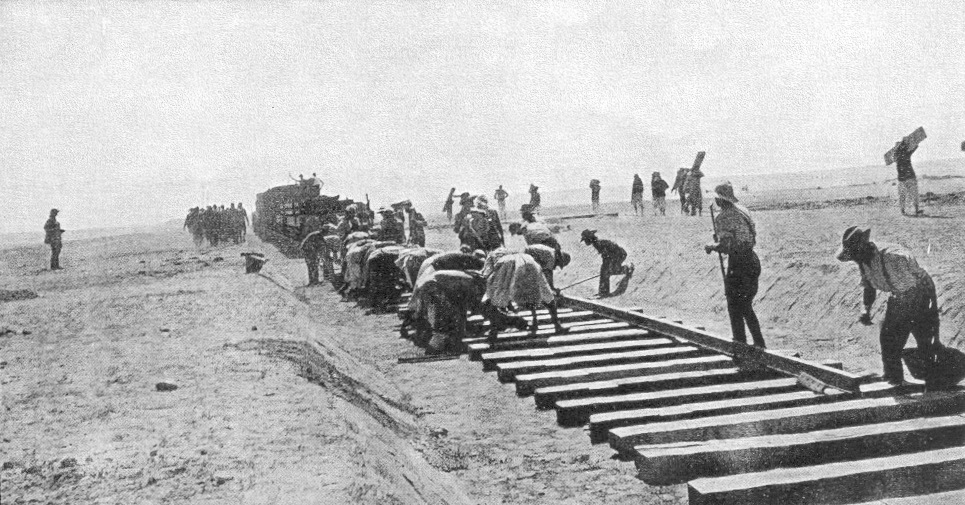
Laying the railway across the Sinai

Following their victory at the Battle of Romani on 4 August 1916, the ANZAC Mounted Division with the 5th Mounted Brigade attached and infantry in support, went onto the offensive. Their advance depended on the construction of a railway and a water pipeline. With the railhead about 40 miles (64 km) away, on 23 December 1916, the ANZAC Mounted Division, less the 2nd Light Horse Brigade but with the Imperial Camel Corps Brigade attached, occupied El Arish during day-long fighting at the Battle of Magdhaba. Meanwhile, the 52nd (Lowland) Division, having marched from Romani, established a garrison at El Arish and began to fortify the town on the Mediterranean Sea, 30 mi (48 km) from the railhead.

El Arish was 90 mi (140 km) by road from the nearest British base, at Kantara, on the Suez Canal, initially making resupply difficult. The arrival of the Royal Navy on 22 December, quickly followed by the first stores on 24 December, meant that during the next fortnight the important Egyptian Expeditionary Force (EEF) forward base grew quickly as 1,500 tons of supplies arrived by ship. Supplies of all kinds were unloaded by the Egyptian Labour Corps and distributed by the Egyptian Camel Transport Corps. Vitally important, the supply activities at El Arish were protected by the infantry garrison and ground-based artillery, supported by the navy. On 4 January 1917, the first construction train arrived at El Arish, but it was some time before the railway, with its vast capacity to support the development of infrastructure and the supply of large garrisons, was fully developed.

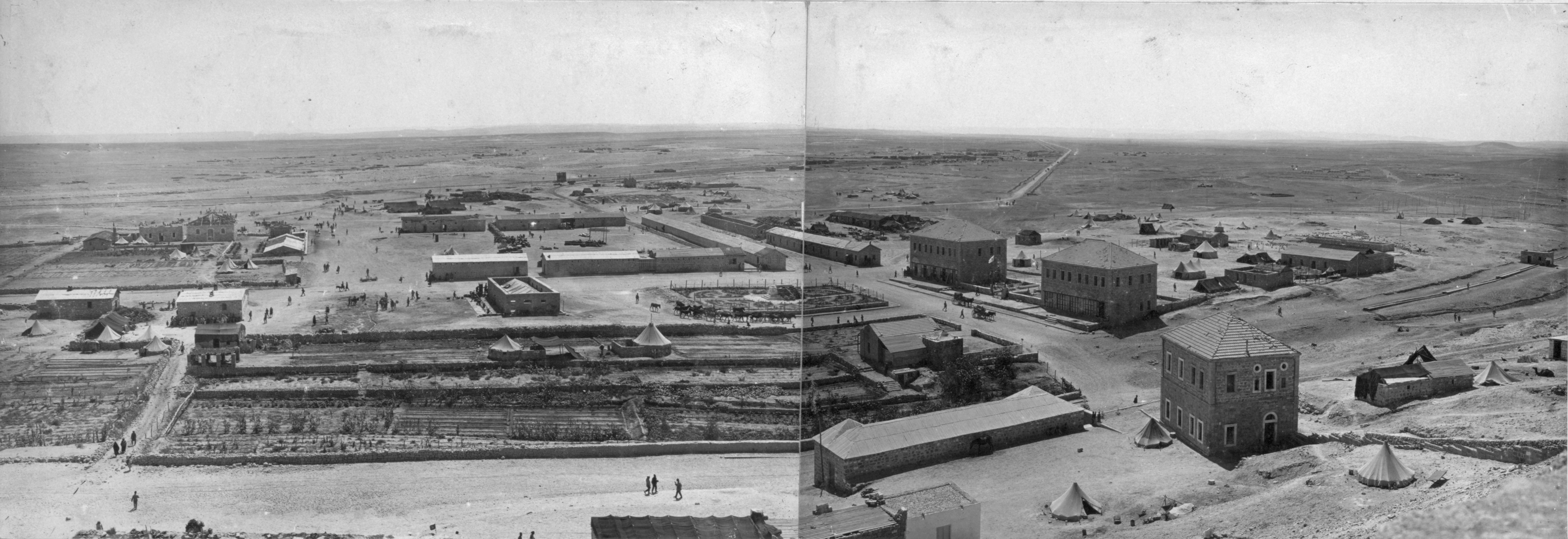
The town of Hafir el Aujah, the Ottoman Army's principal desert base

General Sir Archibald Murray, the commander of the EEF, was keen to complete the advance across the north of the Sinai, to put pressure on the southern Ottoman army. Believing an attack would compel Ottoman forces to abandon their desert bases and outposts on the Egyptian Sinai Peninsula, he ordered an advance from El Arish to Rafa, a distance of 27 mi (43 km), to begin as soon as possible.

== Prelude ==
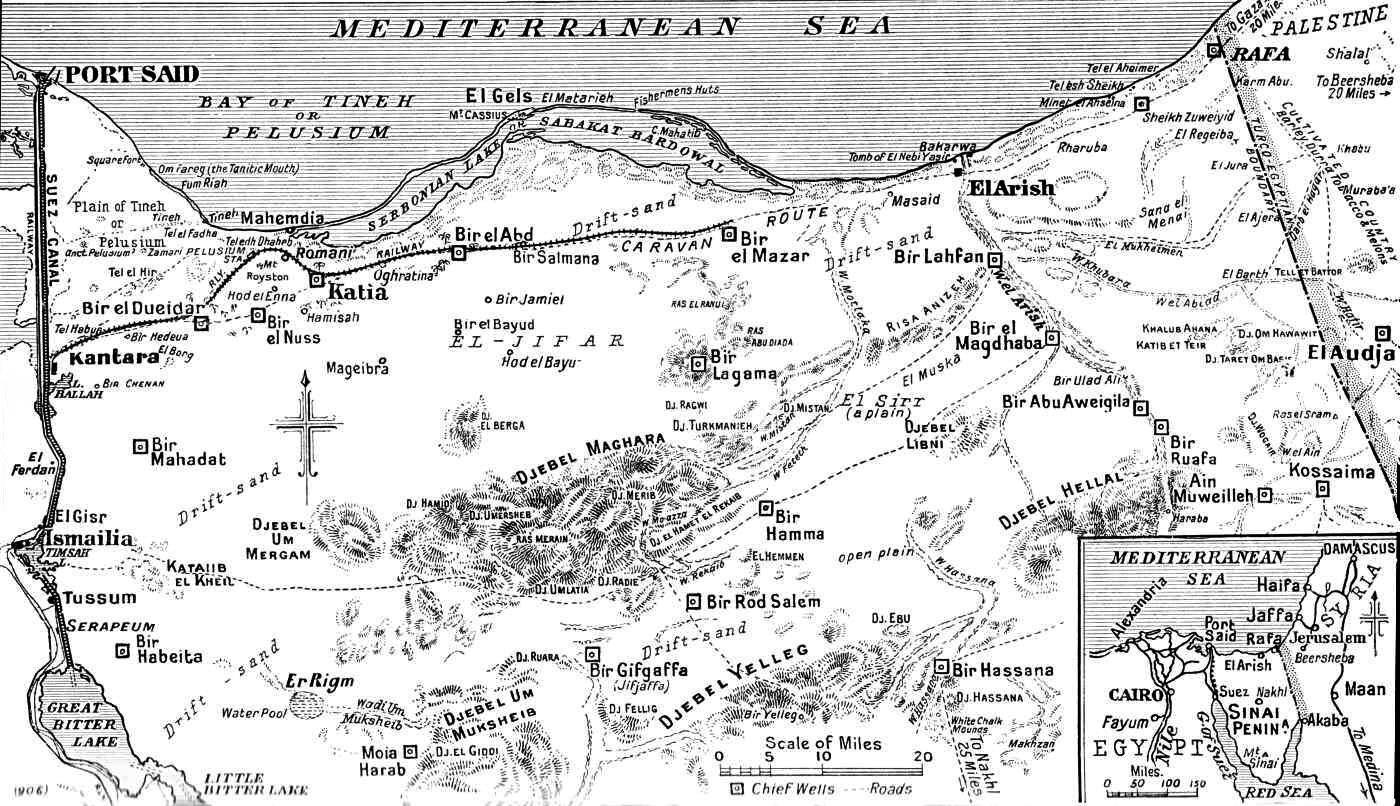
The Sinai and the Suez Canal zone in 1917. The railway had reached Bir el Mazar.

On 28 December, Major General Harry Chauvel, commander of the ANZAC Mounted Division, ordered the 1st Light Horse Brigade to reconnoitre Bir el Burj, 12 mi (19 km) along the road from El Arish towards Rafa. The road was found to be suitable for cars and artillery, and a further reconnaissance by the same brigade two days later to Sheikh Zowaiid, 20 mi (32 km) from El Arish, reported rolling stretches of pasture, crops and poppies. A small advance guard moved ten mi (16 km) further, to within sight of the main Ottoman defences at El Magruntein, reporting "great activity" in the area.

The weather cleared on 5 January, allowing a patrol from No. 1 Squadron, Australian Flying Corps (AFC), to observe 2,000 to 3,000 Ottoman soldiers digging defences south of Rafa in the area of El Magruntein. Two days later, British air patrols found Ottoman garrisons in strength at El Kossaima and Hafir el Auja in central northern Sinai, which could threaten the right flank of the advancing EEF or reinforce Rafa. While the British air patrols were absent on 7 January, German airmen took advantage of the growing concentration of EEF formations and supply dumps, bombing El Arish during the morning and evening. The next day the patrols from No. 1 Squadron AFC were in the air all day, covering preparations for the attack on Rafa.

Lieutenant General Philip Chetwode, commanding the Desert Column, rode out of El Arish at 16:00 on 8 January towards Rafa where a 2,000-strong Ottoman garrison was based. Chetwode's mounted force was the same one that Chauvel had commanded during the Battle of Magdhaba in December, with the addition of the 5th Mounted Brigade (which had been garrisoning El Arish) and the 7th Light Car Patrol consisting of four gun cars and three stores cars. Risking an aerial attack during daylight hours, the force began the 30 mi (48 km) journey before sunset to ensure there was enough time for the force to reach El Magruntein. For the first few miles they trekked over heavy sand dunes, which were difficult to negotiate for the doubled teams of horses pulling the guns and ammunition wagons. Once the great shallow trough, worn down by traffic since ancient times, along the Old Road or Pilgrims' Way appeared, the guns and ammunition wagons travelled on the firm middle way while the mounted units rode on either side. The vanguard of the column reached Sheikh Zowaiid at about 22:00; the Desert Column bivouacked near the crossroads to the west of the village. Here the first grass the horses had seen since leaving Australia was found on the edge of the fertile maritime plain, 16 mi (26 km) north of El Arish.

The plan for the attack at Rafa the next morning, 9 January, was a repetition of Chauvel's successful encirclement attack at Magdhaba. The regiments and motor cars would surround the Ottoman garrison position, gallop up under fire, then dismount to attack the defenders in their treble system of trenches and field-works around the earthwork redoubts on the knoll.

=== Attack force ===
The mounted units of the Desert Column involved in the attack under Chetwode's command were:

- ANZAC Mounted Division, commanded by Chauvel, composed of the 1st and 3rd light horse brigades, the New Zealand Mounted Rifles Brigade, and the Inverness-shire, Leicestershire and Somerset Royal Horse Artillery territorial batteries
- 1st, 2nd and 3rd battalions Imperial Camel Corps Brigade with the Hong Kong and Singapore Mountain Battery
- 5th Mounted Brigade with B Battery, Honourable Artillery Company (HAC) (18-pounders)
- 7th Light Car Patrol consisting of six Ford light armoured motorcars (LAMs) equipped with machine-guns

No. 1 Squadron AFC, which had been based at Mustabig during the El Arish and Magdhaba operations, moved forward five mi (8.0 km) west of El Arish to support the attack.

=== Ottoman defenders ===
Rafa was defended by the Ottoman 31st Infantry Regiment (3rd Division), supported by one mountain gun battery. British aerial reconnaissance had reported this force was between 2,000 and 3,000 strong. They were well entrenched in four main positions on the high ground about Hill 255, known as El Magruntein. Their central redoubt, rising about 200 feet (61 m) to dominate the surrounding grassland, was supported by three systems of redoubts which the British called A, B and C. These redoubts were linked and supported by trenches on the slopes spreading out to the south-east, south and south-west. These strong, well prepared and sited redoubts and trenches provided all-round defence, with a clear view of the battlefield devoid of cover for some 2,000 yards (1,800 m). The only weakness was to the rear of the position, in the north-east.

== Battle ==
The Desert Column began the final approach to attack Rafa on 9 January 1917, without any reserve ammunition for the artillery, rifles or machine-guns. The column's commander, Chetwode, had ordered all wheeled vehicles, excepting the guns, to remain at Sheikh Zowaiid. His brigadiers complied with the order, but only under protest. It had been the intention of Desert Column headquarters that the reserve ammunition would be sent onward after daylight, but during the battle the system broke down and this did not occur, resulting in a critical failure of the ammunition supply. In many cases, supplies were rushed forward, but failed to reach the units requiring them on the firing line.

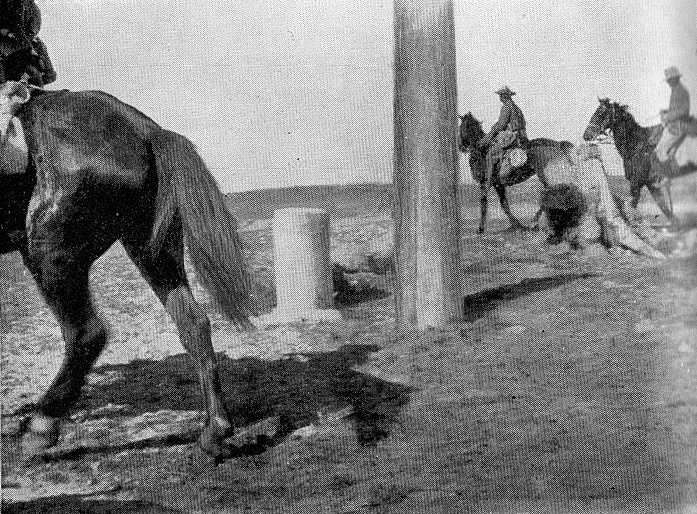
Boundary pillars on the Egyptian Sinai-Ottoman Palestine frontier

At 01:00 the 1st Light Horse and the New Zealand Mounted Rifles brigades led the Desert Column. Half a mile (0.80 km) from Sheikh Zowaiid, they encountered a hostile Bedouin camel patrol which was captured. At 06:15 the Auckland Mounted Rifle Regiment (New Zealand Mounted Rifles Brigade) was first to reach the boundary pillars, crossing the Egyptian-Ottoman frontier. These two brigades rode to a position from which to attack the Rafa defences, from the south, east and north. They were followed at 02:30 by the remainder of the ANZAC Mounted Division, part of the 5th Mounted Brigade, the Imperial Camel Brigade, and six Ford motor cars of the 7th Light Car Patrol. Two troops of the Queen's Own Worcestershire Hussars (5th Mounted Brigade) remained at Sheikh Zowaiid to protect the ammunition column, while a squadron followed the caravan road towards Rafa.

By 06:45 the ANZAC Mounted Division headquarters was established 4.5 mi (7.2 km) west of Karm Ibn Musleh on the frontier to the south of Rafa and El Magruntein. The 1st and 3rd light horse brigades and the artillery took up positions to the south to guard against the Ottoman garrison retreating to the south-east, with the Imperial Camel Corps Brigade located three-quarters of a mile (1.21 km) to the west. The New Zealand Mounted Rifles Brigade was about one mi (1.6 km) to the north with the 5th Mounted Brigade forming the Desert Column's reserve. By 07:00 a patrol of the Wellington Mounted Rifles had cut the telegraph line running east from Rafa towards Shellal and Gaza, isolating the Rafa garrison, Chauvel had reconnoitred the El Magruntein defences and the British Empire horse artillery batteries had begun firing on the redoubts at El Magruntein.

Just after 08:00 the New Zealand Mounted Rifles Brigade circled northwards, moving into position for their attacks on the C4 and C5 groups of redoubts and trenches, while the 1st Light Horse Brigade moved into position to attack the C3, C2 and C1 groups. After these objectives were captured, the two brigades were to attack the central redoubt. Meanwhile, three battalions of the Imperial Camel Brigade were ordered to attack the D group of fortifications. The 3rd Light Horse Brigade formed the ANZAC Mounted Division's reserve. In preparation for the attack, the divisional artillery had pre-selected targets and at 09:30 the Leicestershire, Inverness-shire and Somerset batteries of the Royal Horse Artillery and B Battery, Honourable Artillery Company began a 30-minute preparatory barrage. Under cover of this, the attacking troops began their advance, and by 09:45 they had approached to within 2,000 yd (1,800 m) of the Ottoman entrenchments.

=== Attack begins ===
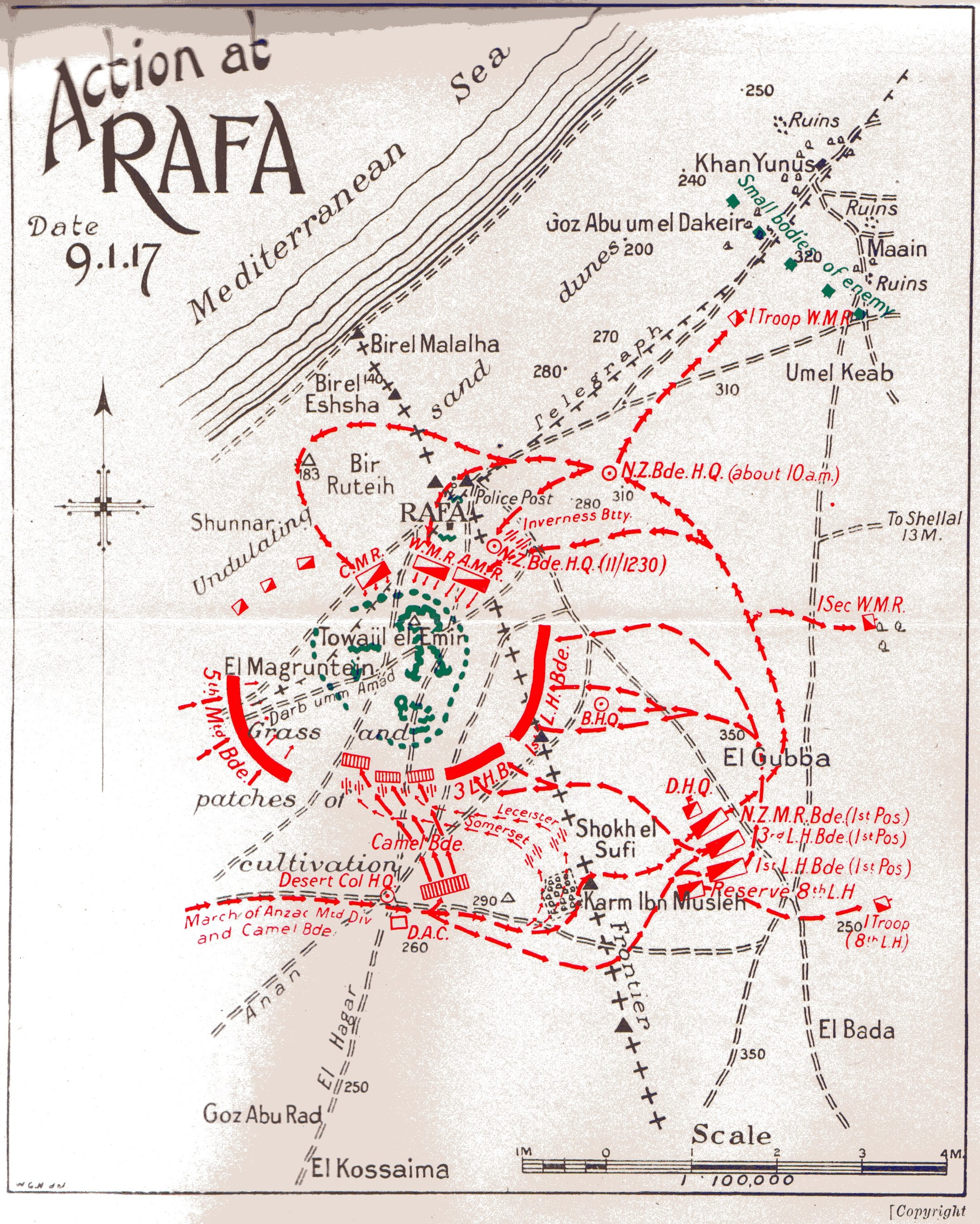
Powles' map showing the attacks on Rafa and El Magruntein

As the 1st Light Horse Brigade advanced from the direction of El Gubba, westward towards El Magruntein and the "C" group of redoubts, they encountered heavy machine-gun and shrapnel fire from German and Ottoman guns. To the south, the Imperial Camel Brigade advanced towards the B4 redoubt, and at 10:30 the 5th Mounted Brigade was ordered "to demonstrate against the works further west." When they arrived at a plateau 2,500 yd (2,300 m) from El Magruntein, the Warwickshire Yeomanry on the right was ordered to attack the B1 and B2 redoubts, while the Royal Gloucestershire Hussars were "sent to the left along the edge of the sand-dunes" to attack the right of the A1 redoubt, the most westerly of the defences. The troops dismounted to begin their attack 2,000 yd (1,800 m) from their objectives, but were immediately engaged by heavy machine-gun fire and shrapnel from two guns.

By 10:00 the attack from the north, led by the Auckland Mounted Rifles and supported by two machine-guns, with the Canterbury Mounted Rifles Regiment on their right, had ridden into Rafa as they circled around El Magruntein. Here, they quickly captured the village along with six German and two Ottoman officers, 16 other ranks and 21 Bedouins. Two troops were sent to watch for the approach of Ottoman reinforcements; one troop to the north towards Khan Yunis and one to the east towards Shellal.

With the Ottoman garrison defending El Magruntein cut off from the north and east by the New Zealand Mounted Rifles Brigade, orders were issued for all Desert Column reserves to be committed and the attack "pressed home." By 11:00 the attacking force was deployed from right to left: the Canterbury and Auckland mounted rifles regiments, two squadrons of the 1st Light Horse Regiment, one squadron of the 2nd Light Horse Regiment, the 3rd Light Horse Regiment (1st Light Horse Brigade), the 10th Light Horse Regiment (3rd Light Horse Brigade), the 1st Battalion Imperial Camel Corps Brigade and the "Warwick and Gloucester Yeomanry". They were supported by the Inverness-shire Battery covering the New Zealanders, the Leicestershire and Somerset batteries covering the Australians and the Hong Kong Battery covering the Camel Corps battalion, while the HAC battery shelled the "C" group of redoubts from a distance of three-quarters of a mile (1.21 km).

Brigadier General Edward Chaytor, commanding the New Zealand Mounted Rifles Brigade, moved his headquarters up to the boundary post one mi (1.6 km) south-east of Rafa, immediately behind the Auckland Mounted Rifles. Half an hour later, the attack was seen to be steadily progressing all along the line. By 12:15 the Wellington Mounted Rifles Regiment had come up to the front line, between the Canterburys on the right, and the Aucklanders on the left, within 600 yd (550 m) of El Magruntein, while the 2nd Battalion of the Camel Brigade advanced to extend the line held by their 1st Battalion. Shortly afterwards, the Canterbury Mounted Rifles Regiment linked up with the left of the 5th Mounted Brigade, completing the cordon around the Ottoman Army entrenchments. To the left of the 5th Mounted Brigade, the 7th Light Car Patrol reached the Rafa road, where they found cover from which to direct fire on to the A1 and A2 redoubts 1,600 yd (1,500 m) away. Meanwhile, the batteries had pushed forward about 1,500 yd (1,400 m) from their previous positions and "B" Battery HAC stopped firing on the "C" group of redoubts. Switching targets to the A1 and A2 redoubts, it recommenced firing at a range of 1,600 yd (1,500 m) in support of the 5th Mounted Brigade.

=== Ammunition shortages ===
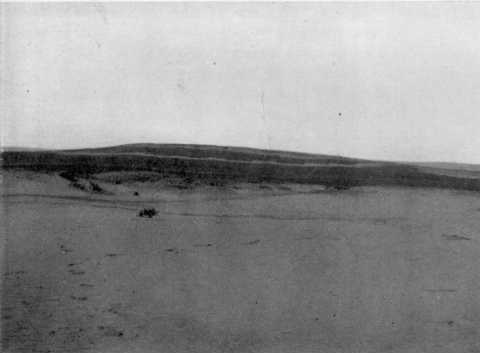
The main Ottoman defensive position and trenches at Rafa

Despite the initial assault, the Ottoman defenders continued to hold very strong defensive positions, with each redoubt ideally placed to provide supporting fire for others. In most places the dismounted attackers were badly exposed to this fire. (Note: While fighting on foot, one quarter of the light horsemen, riflemen and yeomanry were holding the horses; a brigade then became equivalent in rifle strength to an infantry battalion. [Preston 1921 p.168]) A constant stream of fire was maintained on the Ottoman parapets to suppress the defenders and prevent them from taking aim while the attack continued. Little by little the cordon drew tighter under intense fire over the bare, gently-sloping grasslands. However, between about 12:15 and 14:15 progress slowed.

By early to mid-afternoon supplies of ammunition began to run low. Although Chauvel called for further effort, the mistake of leaving the ammunition vehicles behind proved costly, as the attack wavered. The New Zealand Mounted Rifles Brigade ran out of ammunition for four of its machine-guns and the Inverness-shire Battery ran out of shells and had to withdraw. (Note: Major Alexander Wilkie, Quartermaster of the Wellington Mounted Rifles Regiment, remained at Sheikh Zowaiid with the supply convoys. But during the early hours of the battle, he was so concerned by the quantity of .303 small arms ammunition (SAA) – used by both rifles and machine-guns – his regiment had gone into battle with, that he went forward to Rafa. Upon arrival, he heard that his regiment was calling for ammunition. Seizing a cable wagon, he emptied out the signal gear and filled it with boxes of ammunition, and galloped across to the New Zealand Mounted Rifles Brigade in time for the general assault on the redoubt, materially assisting in the final success. [Powles 1922, pp. 77–8])

At 14:30 Chauvel ordered a fresh effort against the C group of redoubts to begin at 15:30, while a sustained artillery barrage was to continue on these redoubts until then. However, 15 minutes later, an Ottoman machine-gun officer and three German soldiers, captured by the troop of the Wellington Mounted Rifles Regiment keeping watch towards Shellal, stated that their 160th Regiment had left Shellal on the Wadi Ghuzzeh when the attack had begun, to reinforce the Rafa garrison. Shellal was between ten and thirteen mi (16 and 21 km) or about three and a half hours away. This was confirmed when two battalions were seen advancing in artillery formation, over the ridges west of Shellal towards Rafa. An additional 500 soldiers were seen approaching Rafa from the direction of Khan Yunus by the same mounted rifle regiment's northern guard.

=== Final assaults ===
The general assault, launched at 15:30, was supported by all available guns. It made slow progress against the stubborn Ottoman defenders, who were supported by bombing from German planes, while the advance guard of Ottoman reinforcements, from Khan Yunus in the north and Shellal in the east, were attacking the two troops of the Wellington Mounted Rifles Regiment. Four guns of the Canterbury Mounted Rifles Regiment, on the right flank, were moved to a trench before being moved forward to the sunken road. From there they maintained effective overhead covering fire, until the assaulting troops were within a few yards of the trenches. These guns were also well-positioned to provide cover if pressure by the Ottoman reinforcements from Khan Yunus and Shellal proved too strong for the two troops of Wellingtons, or if the New Zealand Mounted Rifles Brigade was forced to retire to the coast.

After steady, methodical and persistent work, by 16:00 a cloud of smoke hung over the central redoubt from rifle and machine-gun fire. The covering fire was so effective that the Ottoman defenders had extreme difficulty aiming and firing their rifles and machine-guns. It then became possible for the attacking forces to cover the last 600–800 yd (550–730 m) of smooth grassy slope in two rushes. At about 16:30, the New Zealand Mounted Rifles Brigade launched its final assault on the central redoubt from the north-west, the north and the north-east. Lacking artillery support, they made determined use of machine-guns on the firing line, crossing fire to get better targets, and co-operating with the machine-guns of the 1st Light Horse Brigade to cover the advance to within 400 yd (370 m) of the main Ottoman position. They captured the central redoubt in a final bayonet charge, at the run, many of the soldiers firing as they went. From their captured position in the dominating central redoubt, they were able to enfilade other redoubts still held by Ottoman defenders.

With the New Zealanders holding the dominant redoubt, the 1st and the 3rd light horse brigades were able to advance and capture the remaining redoubts on their fronts. As the 3rd Battalion of the Imperial Camel Brigade approached the B group of trenches, a white flag appeared, and the B2 and the central work of B group were occupied by 16:50. They captured five officers and 214 other ranks while the Warwickshire Yeomanry captured the B1 redoubt and another 101 prisoners. These successful attacks were supported by aircraft, which bombed the redoubts and trenches. The aircraft had recently been fitted with wirelesses, and during the afternoon reported the progress of the battle to the Desert Column's headquarters, assisting in command and control. The New Zealanders remained close to the main redoubt system while prisoners were collected and sent to Sheikh Zowaiid and the four captured guns taken away. Chetwode reported to the commander of Eastern Force, Lieutenant General Charles Macpherson Dobell, that the work of all troops engaged had been excellent, and the part played by the New Zealand Mounted Rifles Brigade had been outstanding.

=== Casualties ===
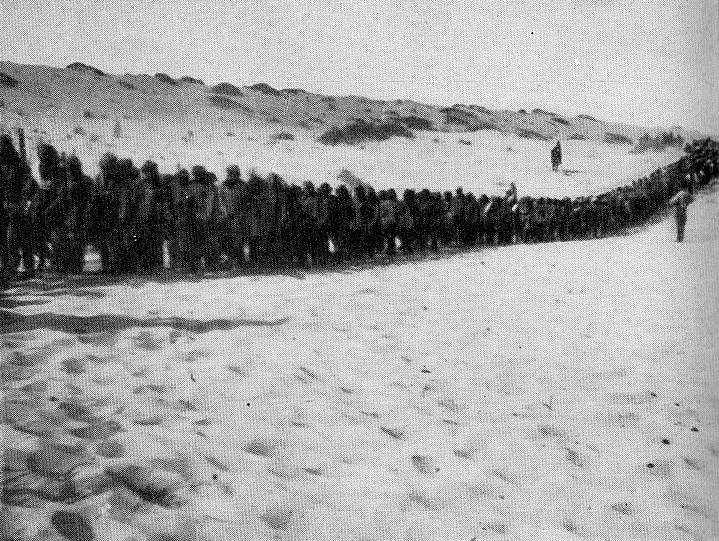
Ottoman prisoners on the road to El Arish from Rafa

During the fighting the Desert Column suffered three times the losses endured at Magdhaba. The 487 casualties included 124 New Zealanders: 71 killed, 415 wounded and one missing. Against this, the mainly Ottoman prisoners, which included some German machine-gunners, totalled between 1,472 and 1,635, with 162 of them wounded. About 200 Ottoman soldiers were killed on the battlefield.

== Aftermath ==
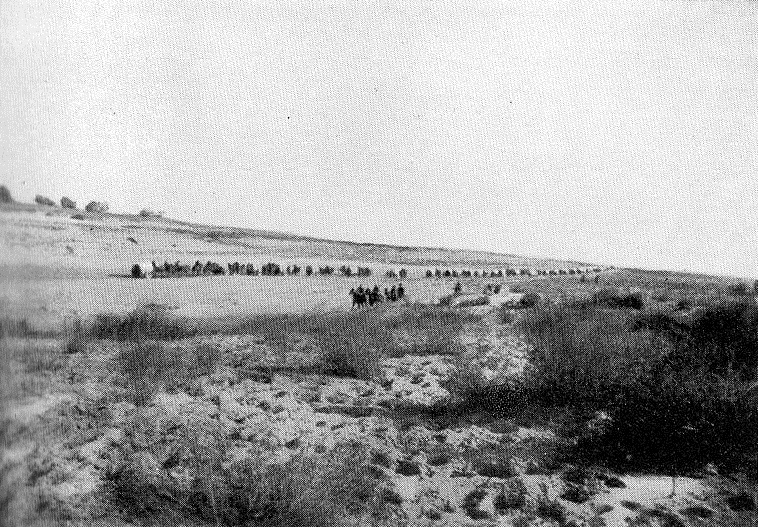
British Empire ambulance wagons returning to Sheikh Zowaiid from Rafa

Following the battle, a strong rearguard position manned by two light horse regiments, commanded by Lieutenant Colonel Leslie Cecil Maygar, was established. Meanwhile, the bulk of the Desert Column returned to Sheikh Zowaiid for water and rations, arriving at about midnight. The two light horse regiments that had remained at Rafa stood guard, while the battlefield was cleared by the light horse field ambulances, whose stretcher bearers worked into the night. The 3rd Light Horse Field Ambulance, covered by the 8th Light Horse Regiment (3rd Light Horse Brigade), remained on the battlefield, as all available ambulance carts and empty wagons were sent up from Sheikh Zowaiid to help transport the wounded to hospital.

The ANZAC Mounted Division's field ambulance units had been reorganised before the battle, and were equipped with 10 pairs of litters, 15 pairs of cacolets, 12 sand-carts, 12 cycle stretchers and six sledges. With this, they were able transport 92 patients at a time, and they set about the task of evacuating the wounded. The following morning, the 8th Light Horse Regiment was attacked by Ottoman cavalry and camel units. After a period of fighting, the attackers were forced to withdraw, leaving 14 prisoners behind. The whole of the 3rd Light Horse Brigade returned to the battlefield on 10 January with the 7th Light Car Patrol and wagons to collect captured material.

=== El Arish bombed ===
During the night of 19 January, with the benefit of a full moon, German and Ottoman aircraft carried out the biggest aerial bombing raid yet, inflicted on the EEF's fast-growing and important forward base of El Arish. As well as dropping bombs, these aircraft, probably the powerful new Albatros D.IIIs, swooped down, firing their machine-guns into the camp. Casualties, particularly in the horse lines which were an obvious target from the air, were considerable.

=== Murray's plans ===
The campaign across the Sinai desert, which had begun in August, ended with the expulsion of the Ottoman Empire from Egyptian territory. With the British victory at Rafa, the steady progress of the railway and the water pipeline, and the build-up of supplies at El Arish, the EEF was able to build a firm base from which it planned to advance into Ottoman territory. To do so, they needed to capture Gaza first and subsequently the First Battle of Gaza took place in March 1917.

On 19 January, British aerial reconnaissance found the Ottoman Army had evacuated El Kossaima and reduced the strength of their main desert base at Hafir el Auja. However, GHQ believed the Ottoman garrisons would continue to hold onto the Nekhl area in the centre of the Sinai Peninsula, including the villages of Bir el Hassana, Gebel Helal, Gebel Yelleg and Gebel el Heitan, to maintain control over the Arab population. To address the problem of Ottoman Army units in the rear of the advancing EEF, a raid was carried out by two columns of light horse and yeomanry at Nekhl. The two columns moved out from Serapeum, near Ismailia on the Suez Canal, with three aircraft in support to carry out the attack, 60 mi (97 km) to the east. However, as the columns were approaching the area on 17 February, the reconnaissance aircraft found the Ottoman garrisons had retired, and no fighting occurred.
