= Light horse field ambulance =

Australian World War One unit

A light horse field ambulance was an Australian World War I military unit whose purpose was to provide medical transport and aid to the wounded and sick soldiers of an Australian Light Horse brigade. Light horse field ambulance units served in the Australian Imperial Force (AIF) as part of the Australian Army Medical Corps.

Typically a Lieutenant Colonel commanded each ambulance. All officers of the ambulance were medical doctors or surgeons. Dental units were often attached to the ambulance as well.

An ambulance consisted of two sections, the Mobile and the Immobile. The Mobile Section travel with its brigade into combat, where it would establish a Dressing Station. It use stretchers or carts to retrieve the wounded and transport them to the Dressing Station. The Immobile Section established and operated a Receiving Station, which received the wounded the Dressing Station sent on. The ambulance's surgeons would operate on the wounded at the Receiving Station. From the Receiving Station, the sick and wounded would go first to the Casualty Clearing Station and ultimately to a Base Hospital.

== Transport ==
The light horse field ambulances operated during the Gallipoli campaign and in the Middle East theatre: Egypt, the Sinai peninsula, Palestine and Syria. The methods used to transport the wounded had to operate effectively in the sandy, dusty environment.

Stretcher
As in infantry field ambulances, stretchers were used for transport over short distances, rough terrain or when enemy fire prevented the safe employment of bearer animals.

Cycle stretcher
These were unpopular and ineffective; after the Gaza battles the forces abandoned the use of cycle stretchers.

Sand cart
The mainstay of the transport section was the sand cart. It featured wide steel rims and was designed be able to carry three stretchers over soft sand. Six horses or mules provided the motive power. The sand cart was poorly suited to operating on the hard, rough ground of Palestine and Syria, and breakdowns were frequent.

Sand sledge
Used to transport one stretcher case over sand; two horses pulled the sledge.

Light ambulance wagon
Drawn by a four horse team, the light ambulance wagon was designed by Surgeon Colonel W.D.C. Williams. Wagons of this type were taken to Egypt by some of the field ambulance units during the early days of World War I.

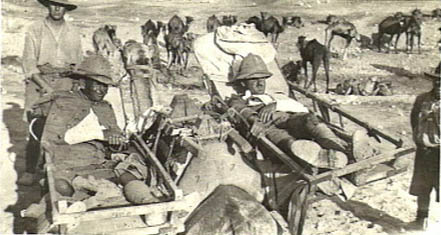
Camel Cacolet

Camel cacolet
The camel cacolet was used to carry wounded over long distances on rough terrain impassable to wheeled transport. There were two types of cacolet: the sitting and the lying down type. One camel would carry two patients, one on either side of the camel's hump.

== Units during World War I ==
Three Australian light horse field ambulance units remained in active service throughout WWI. Additional units were established and disbanded at several points during the war. By the end of WWI, the AIF had five light horse field ambulances in active service.

Australian Imperial Force (AIF) light horse field ambulance units serving in WWI
Unit	Established	Theatres of conflict	Notes
1st Light Horse Field Ambulance	18 August 1914; New South Wales, Australia	Egypt; Gallipoli; Sinai Peninsula; Palestine	Unit served throughout WWI.
2nd Light Horse Field Ambulance	September 1914; Queensland, Australia	Egypt; Gallipoli; Sinai Peninsula; Palestine	Unit served throughout WWI.
3rd Light Horse Field Ambulance	02 October 1914; Queensland, Australia	Egypt; Gallipoli; Sinai Peninsula; Palestine	Unit served throughout WWI.
4th Light Horse Field Ambulance (1)	May-June 1915; Queensland, Australia	Egypt	Disbanded March 1916
4th Light Horse Field Ambulance (2)	18 February 1917; Moascar, Egypt	Egypt; Palestine	Unit served from 1917 until end of WWI.
Camel Field Ambulance	February 1917	Sinai Peninsula; Palestine	Renamed 5th Light Horse Field Ambulance; June 1918
5th Light Horse Field Ambulance	June 1918	Palestine	Unit served from 1918 until end of WWI.

== WWI Military awards and decorations ==
Military decorations were awarded to a number of WWI personnel serving in the Australian light horse field ambulance units. Although the light horse field ambulance units were part of the AIF, decorations were awarded under the British system of honours as Australia's system of honours would not be established until 1975.

WWI Military decorations awarded to the Australian light horse field ambulance (LHFA) service personnel
Honour/Award	Rank, name (service number)	Unit	Date announced	
Honour/Award	Rank, name (service number)	Unit	Australian Gazette	London Gazette
Distinguished Service Order (DSO)	Major William Angus Fraser	3rd LHFA	4 October 1917	4 June 1917
Distinguished Service Order (DSO)	Lieutenant-Colonel John Robert McNeil Beith	2nd LHFA	25 March 1920	12 December 1919
Distinguished Service Order (DSO)	Lieutenant-Colonel Mylles Wysmarus Cave	1st LHFA	25 March 1920	12 December 1919
Distinguished Service Order (DSO)	Major Clive Vallack Single	4th LHFA	06 October 1919	3 June 1919
Distinguished Service Order (DSO)	Lieutenant-Colonel Gerald Eugene Macdonald Stuart	3rd LHFA	06 October 1919	3 June 1919
Military Cross (MC)	Captain Colin Anderson	4th LHFA	23 May 1919	1 January 1919
Distinguished Conduct Medal (DCM)	Private George Laurie Peel (913)	3rd LHFA	24 February 1916	29 November 1915
Distinguished Conduct Medal (DCM)	Private Finlay O'Neill McRae (1775)	1st LHFA	24 February 1916	29 November 1915
Distinguished Conduct Medal (DCM)	Private Arthur John Vines (902)	3rd LHFA	24 February 1916	29 November 1915
Distinguished Conduct Medal (DCM)	Sergeant William Henry Storey (64)	1st LHFA	19 April 1917	14 November 1916
Distinguished Conduct Medal (DCM)	Sergeant John Ware Robinson (838)	3rd LHFA	21 August 1917	26 April 1917
Distinguished Conduct Medal (DCM)	Sergeant Robert Henry Lewis (825)	3rd LHFA	20 December 1917	16 August 1917
Distinguished Conduct Medal (DCM)	Staff Sergeant Charles Warden (3)	4th LHFA	23 May 1918	22 October 1917
Distinguished Conduct Medal (DCM)	Staff Sergeant James Edward Sleeman (567)	2nd LHFA	4 February 1919	3 September 1918
Military Medal (MM)	Private Francis George Ridge (2712)	4th LHFA	14 December 1916	21 September 1916
Military Medal (MM)	Driver Hector Thomson (482)	2nd LHFA	19 April 1917	21 October 1916
Military Medal (MM)	Driver Thomas Mahoney (527)	2nd LHFA	19 April 1917	21 October 1916
Military Medal (MM)	Driver Charles Alexander James Crawford (529)	2nd LHFA	19 April 1917	21 October 1916
Military Medal (MM)	Driver Cecil George Audley Done (4261)	2nd LHFA	19 April 1917	21 October 1916
Military Medal (MM)	Private William John Gordon Davis (9388)	2nd LHFA	19 April 1917	21 October 1916
Military Medal (MM)	Corporal Thomas Vincent Brennan (565)	2nd LHFA	19 April 1917	01 December 1916
Military Medal (MM)	Private William Robertson (26)	1st LHFA	19 April 1917	14 December 1916
Military Medal (MM)	Private Arthur John Bennett (955)	1st LHFA	07 August 1918	19 March 1918
Military Medal (MM)	Driver Septimus Flint (6051)	1st LHFA	07 August 1918	19 March 1918
Military Medal (MM)	Driver Eric Holloway (15506)	1st LHFA	07 August 1918	19 March 1918
Military Medal (MM)	Lance Sergeant Ernest Kitson Thorpe (3865)	4th LHFA	17 October 1919	3 July 1919
Military Medal (MM)	Private William Phillips Whittlesea (2830)	3rd LHFA	17 October 1919	3 July 1919
Meritorious Service Medal (MSM)	Trooper Harold Shove Thirkell (16659)	1st LHFA	27 November 1918	16 July 1918
Meritorious Service Medal (MSM)	Sergeant Christopher Standring (519)	4th LHFA	06 October 1919	03 June 1919

== See also ==
- Military unit
- Field hospital
- Australian Army Medical Units, World War I
