= ANZAC Mounted Division =

Australian and New Zealand Mounted Division
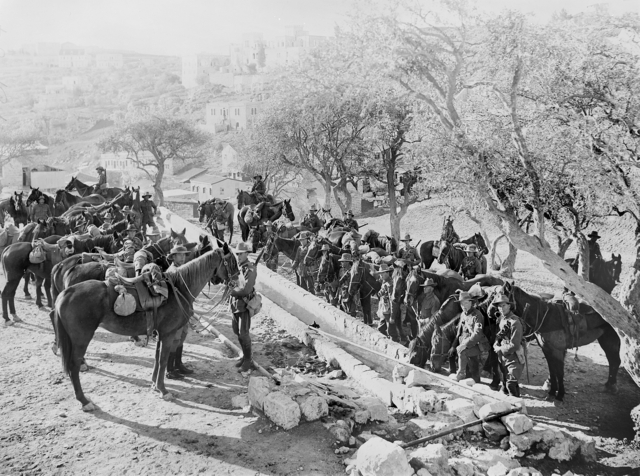
- Men of the division watering their horses at the foot of Mount Zion, January 1918.
- Active: 16 March 1916 – 30 June 1919
- Country: Australia; New Zealand; United Kingdom
- Allegiance: British Empire
- Branch: Army
- Type: Mounted infantry Horse artillery
- Role: Manoeuvre warfare
- Size: Division
- Part of: I ANZAC Corps; Eastern Force; Desert Column; Desert Mounted Corps; XX Corps
- Engagements: First World War: Sinai and Palestine campaign; 1919 Egyptian revolution See battles section for more information

Commanders
- (1916–17): Harry Chauvel
- (1917–18): Edward Chaytor
- (1918–19): Granville Ryrie

Insignia
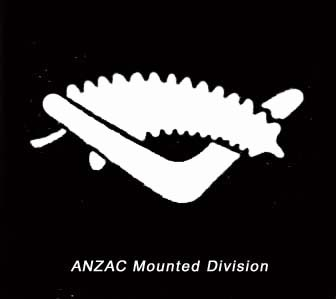
- Tactical formation sign
- Abbreviation: ANZACS

The Australian and New Zealand Mounted Division was a mounted infantry division of the British Empire during World War I. The division was raised in March 1916 and was assigned to the I ANZAC Corps. On establishment, it consisted of four brigades comprising three Australian Light Horse and one New Zealand mounted rifles, supported by British horse artillery. In 1917, one of the Australian brigades was replaced by a British yeomanry brigade. After April 1917, the standard order of battle was reduced to two Australian brigades and one New Zealand brigade, although the Imperial Camel Corps Brigade and other British mounted brigades were temporarily attached several times during operations.

The division had two wartime commanders; the first was the Australian major-general Harry Chauvel, who had commanded the 1st Light Horse Brigade at Gallipoli. When Chauvel was promoted to command the Desert Column – of which the division was part – he was replaced by the New Zealander major-general Edward Chaytor from the New Zealand Mounted Rifles Brigade, who remained in command for the rest of the war. Post-war, Brigadier-General Granville Ryrie commanded the division from December 1918 until it was disbanded in June 1919.

In December 1915, the brigades that would form the ANZAC Mounted Division were evacuated from the Gallipoli Campaign and became part of the British Empire's Egyptian Expeditionary Force. In March 1916, after raising the division served, as the mounted formation, in the I ANZAC Corps. Then subsequently served under the command of Eastern Force for most of 1916. The division served in the Desert Column from the end of 1916 until mid-1917, when the column was expanded and renamed the Desert Mounted Corps. The division fought and won almost all the major battles across the Sinai Peninsula during 1916, and the following year it fought from Gaza to Jerusalem in southern Palestine. In 1918, it took part in the Jordan Valley operations, the raid on Amman, the raid on Es Salt and the final advance to Amman and Ziza, part of the Battle of Megiddo. During which the division formed the main part of Chaytor's Force – which captured 10,300 men from the Turkish Fourth Army. (Note: At the time of the First World War, the modern Turkish state did not exist, and instead it was part of the Ottoman Empire. While the terms have distinct historical meanings, within many English-language sources the term "Turkey" and "Ottoman Empire" are used synonymously, although many academic sources differ in their approaches. The sources used in this article predominately use the term "Turkey".)

== Etymology ==
The division is variously referred to in sources as the Australian and New Zealand Mounted Division, (abbreviated to the A. & N. Z. Mounted Division), the ANZAC Mounted Division, or the Anzac Mounted Division.

== Formation history ==
Prior to formation, units that would form the division's brigades served as part of the Force in Egypt from December 1914, and then in the Australian and New Zealand Army Corps, from May to December 1915, during the Gallipoli Campaign. At Gallipoli, the 1st, 2nd, and 3rd Light Horse Brigades and the New Zealand Mounted Rifles Brigade served dismounted in the New Zealand and Australian Division. Them returned to Egypt where the ANZAC Mounted Division was formed in March 1916; and assigned to the I ANZAC Corps as its mounted formation. The first mounted or cavalry division to serve with the Egyptian Expeditionary Force (EEF). The brigades consisted of three regiments, each with an establishment of twenty-five officers and 497 other ranks serving in three squadrons, of six troops. (Note: Powles gives the New Zealand regiments as twenty-four officers and 499 other ranks.) Not all the division's troops came from Australia and New Zealand; the artillery units, with 18-pounders, (Note: These were replaced by 13 pounders before the Battle of Beersheba.) and the Divisional Ammunition Column were provided by the British Royal Horse Artillery from the Territorial Force. The brigade's four batteries were each allocated to a fighting brigade. (Note: The basic organic unit of the Royal Artillery was, and is, the battery. An artillery brigade was the basic tactical unit of the British artillery during World War I and was usually commanded by a lieutenant-colonel.) The 1st Light Horse Brigade had the Leicestershire Battery; the 2nd Light Horse Brigade, the Ayrshire Battery; the 3rd Light Horse Brigade, the Inverness-shire Battery, and the Somerset Battery was attached to the New Zealand Mounted Rifles Brigade. To replace the 3rd Light Horse Brigade, which had been assigned to the Imperial Mounted Division in January 1917, the British 22nd Mounted Brigade joined the division from February to July 1917. Serving alongside them were several smaller support units, which included an engineer field squadron, a signal squadron, and a divisional train.

ANZAC Mounted Division from 1917

Commanders
Major-General Harry Chauvel (1916–17)
Major-General Edward Chaytor (1917–18)
Brigadier-General Granville Ryrie (1918–19)
1st Light Horse Brigade

1st Light Horse Regiment
2nd Light Horse Regiment
3rd Light Horse Regiment
1st Machine-Gun Squadron
1st Signal Troop

2nd Light Horse Brigade

5th Light Horse Regiment
6th Light Horse Regiment
7th Light Horse Regiment
2nd Machine-Gun Squadron
2nd Signal Troop

New Zealand Mounted Rifles Brigade

Auckland Mounted Rifles Regiment
Canterbury Mounted Rifles Regiment
Wellington Mounted Rifles Regiment
1st New Zealand Machine-Gun Squadron
New Zealand Mounted Rifles Brigade Signal Troop

XVIII Brigade, Royal Horse Artillery (T.F.)

Inverness-shire Battery
Ayrshire Battery
Somerset Battery
XVIII RHA Brigade Ammunition Column

Engineers

1st Field Squadron
1st Signal Squadron

Medical Services

1st Light Horse Field Ambulance
2nd Light Horse Field Ambulance
New Zealand Mounted Field Ambulance
7th Sanitary Section

Train

32nd Australian Army Service Corps Company
33rd Australian Army Service Corps Company
34th Australian Army Service Corps Company
5th New Zealand Army Service Corps Company
26th Depot Supply Unit

Veterinary Services

6th Mobile Veterinary Section
7th Mobile Veterinary Section
2nd New Zealand Mobile Veterinary Section

The first general officer commanding (GOC) Major-general Harry Chauvel, appointed 16 March, was promoted from brigade commander, although he had temporarily commanded the 1st Australian Division for a short period at Gallipoli. His chief-of staff was Lieutenant-colonel John Gilbert Browne of 14th (King's) Hussars, a professional from the British Army who had fought in the Second Boer War and with the British Cavalry Division, on the Western Front in the early stages of the war. The rest of the division's staff were selected on merit for their service at Gallipoli. The same process was applied to select the brigade staff, and regimental and squadron officers – most of whom had seen prior service at Gallipoli or in the Second Boer War.

== Service history ==
=== Sinai ===
On 15 March, the ANZAC Mounted Division relieved the 1st Australian Division, on the front line. Members of the division carried out their first offensive action, crossing the Suez Canal, in the Jifjafa raid between 11 and 14 April 1916, resulting in the campaign's first Australian death. Later the same month, the 2nd and the New Zealand Brigades were moved into the Sinai Desert in response to the defeat at Katia of the 5th Mounted Brigade. By the end of the month, the division had been established around Romani in the Sinai. Here the brigade machine-gun squadrons were formed; each had eight officers and 222 other ranks, with twelve Maxim guns carried on pack horses. These replaced the two guns that had previously been part of each regiment's establishment. In their place, the regiments were issued with three Lewis guns; these were replaced the following year by twelve Hotchkiss machine-guns.

On 19 July, reconnaissance aircraft located between 8–9,000 Turkish soldiers approaching the division's prepared positions. By 3 August, this number had increased to around 18,000 infantry with artillery support. (Note: New Zealand History gives the number as 16,000.) The Battle of Romani was the division's first major victory. The advance to contact without infantry support, which began the next day, was defeated at Bir el Abd by a stronger Turkish force.

In September, the division was involved in a "reconnaissance in force" to Mazar, forty miles (64 km) east of Romani. They were discovered en route by German aircraft and the although the operation failed, it persuaded Turkish commanders to evacuate the position two days later. On 11 November, the division was ordered to move east towards Masaid and El Arish on the coast. The division entered the latter on 21 December to find the Turkish garrison had withdrawn. The next day, Lieutenant-general Philip Chetwode, commanding the Desert Column, arrived and ordered the division – supported by the Imperial Camel Corps Brigade (ICCB) – to attack Magdhaba. Travelling overnight, most of the division was in position by dawn 23 December. Using the additional strength of the camel brigade, and at times fighting hand to hand, Chauvel's attack on Magdhaba was the division's second victory. Turkish casualties were ninety-seven dead, three hundred wounded and 1,282 prisoners, while the division's were twenty-three dead and 124 wounded. (Note: New Zealand History gives the number as twenty-two dead.)

On 8 January 1917, the division, still with the ICCB under command, continued the advance towards the pre-war Egypt-Palestine border at Rafa. They moved twenty-six miles (42 km) from El Arish to Rafa overnight and by 07:00 they were ready for the assault to begin. The Battle of Rafa, although harder fought, became the division's third victory. Total casualties were seventy-one dead and 415 wounded for the division and the 5th Mounted Brigade who were also involved. Against this, Turkish casualties were two hundred dead, 168 wounded and 1,434 prisoners.

=== Gaza ===
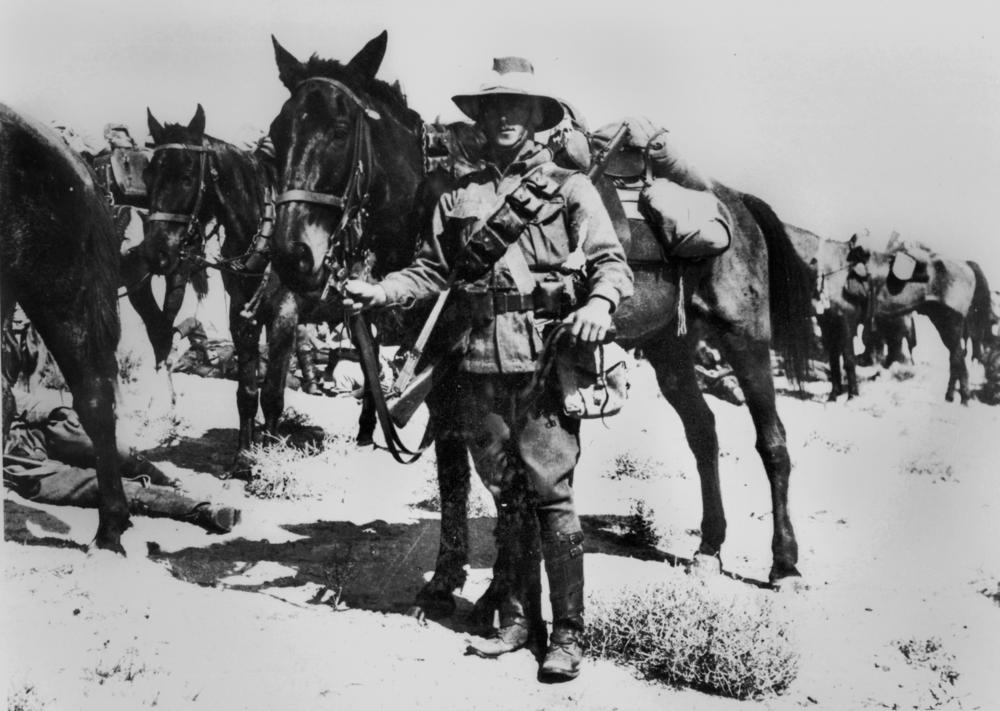
Lighthorseman, horse, and their equipment

In February 1917, just before the division moved forward to take part in the first battle for Gaza, the British 22nd Mounted Brigade – a yeomanry brigade from the Territorial Force – joined the division. The first reconnaissance of the Turkish position at Gaza was carried out by the 3rd Light Horse Brigade on 25 March. The rest of the Desert Column moved forward that night. British intelligence had estimated that Gaza garrison comprised around four thousand troops, with their nearest reinforcements ten miles (16 km) away. In fact they had around 15,000 troops based within seventeen miles (27 km) of Gaza. The division's objective was to circle the town to the east and provide a screen against a counter-attack from the north. At 02:30 on 26 March, the division moved out; by 06:00, ground fog – which had covered the infantry and mounted advance – lifted and they were discovered by a Turkish patrol. The division's nearest troops charged the Turks and came upon an airfield where two German aircraft took off, turned and attacked the mounted troops. The division responded; one squadron per regiment dismounted and returned fire. By sunrise, the division was behind the Turkish lines and engaged in several skirmishes. During the light horse advance to the coast north of Gaza, the Turkish GOC responsible for the Gaza defences was taken prisoner. The 53rd (Welsh) Division had been responsible for the attack on the town; by 13:00, they had not made much progress and were held down by strong defences. The ANZAC Mounted Division was ordered at 15:15 to prepare for a dismounted assault. Chauvel completed his concentration within an hour. Then, fighting hand to hand and using their bayonets, the division reached the outskirts of the town. The New Zealand and the 2nd Light Horse Brigades entered the town from the north and west. At 18:00, Lieutenant General Charles Macpherson Dobell, GOC Eastern Force, and Chetwode agreed to call off the attack towards nightfall, due to their belief that there was a lack of progress, and the approaching threat from Turkish reinforcements. According to Gullett, the error in that decision can perhaps be demonstrated by the lack of any Turkish intervention to the division's regrouping and withdrawal back to their own lines. At 21:30, the Turkish reinforcements were still several miles away; one group confronted by the 3rd Light Horse Brigade immediately stopped advancing. In Chetwode's post-action report, he says that the time taken for the division to regroup was caused by them retrieving their wounded from inside Gaza. British wireless operators intercepted a Turkish Army message from Gaza, timed at 19:45, reporting that their position had been lost.

The failure at Gaza resulted in the Turkish Army building a sixteen miles (26 km) long defence line between Gaza and Beersheba, defended by 20–25,000 troops. Dobell's plan for the second battle required his infantry to assault Gaza itself while the mounted forces would operate on their right flank, to force the Turkish troops towards Beersheba, hinder the movement of reinforcements from there to Gaza, and prepare to pursue any retreating Turkish forces. (Note: This battle was the first one after the issue of Hotchkiss Machine-guns to the regiments.)

Preliminary manoeuvring began on 16 April and the main attack would start the next day. At 02:00, the division was in position at Shellal. Reconnaissance patrols convinced Chauvel they would be unable to break through the Ottoman line without infantry support. The main infantry battle began at 07:15 on 19 April following a two-hour bombardment, with the division deployed to attack Sausage Ridge on the extreme right of the three British infantry division's assault at Gaza. The division suffered severe casualties while it was comparatively inactive during the infantry attacks. However, during the previous night of 18/19 April, Chauvel – under orders not to make a dismounted attack – moved towards the Hareira Redoubt to protect the army's right. In the morning of 19 April, the 1st and 3rd Light Horse Brigades advanced without opposition. However, by mid-afternoon they were confronted by around one thousand Turkish cavalrymen, whom they fought off with rifle, machine-gun and artillery fire. By 20 April, the attack had halted in a decisive victory for the Turkish forces. The attack cost the British 5,900 casualties, but only 105 of those were from the division – the fewest of any involved. (Note: The next lowest numbers of casualties was 345 for the Imperial Camel Corps Brigade. The highest being 2,971 for the 54th (East Anglian) Division.)

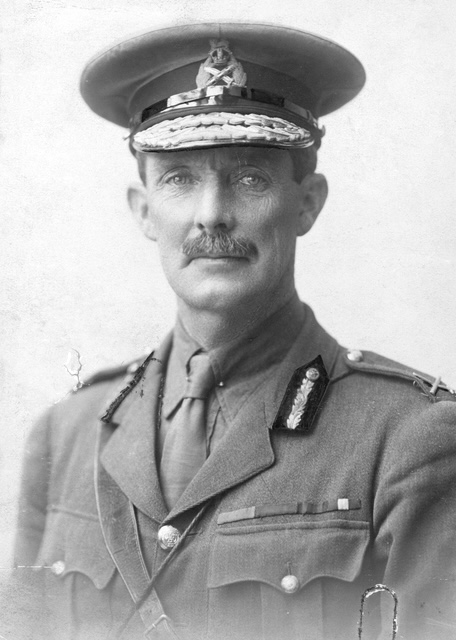
The second GOC Major-general Edward Chaytor

This second failure resulted in the recall of Murray and the appointment of General Edmund Allenby to command the EEF. When Chauvel had been promoted to command the Desert Column, he was replaced as GOC by Chaytor who had commanded the New Zealand Mounted Rifles Brigade. Other changes resulted in the division losing the 3rd Light Horse Brigade to the new Imperial Mounted Division, and the Yeomanry Mounted Division was also raised. This enabled the three divisions to rotate monthly from the front line to resting, to carry out training during a period of inaction. During May, the 1st Light Horse Brigade and divisional engineers were involved in a raid on the Turkish railway line running south of Beersheba towards the frontier with Egypt, while the other two brigades moved forward in support.

=== Beersheba ===
On 24 October, the 2nd Light Horse Brigade moved forward to Asluj to screen the advance of the ANZAC and the Australian Mounted Divisions. On 31 October, Beersheba was captured after the town was attacked by two infantry and two mounted divisions. The 1st Light Horse and the New Zealand Brigades made a combined attack on Tel el Saba, after the 2nd Light Horse Brigade had cut the road north from Beersheba to Hebron. At 15:00 the same day, the New Zealanders attacked and captured with 132 prisoners and four machine-guns with a bayonet charge, while the retreating Turkish soldiers were pursued by the 1st Light Horse Brigade. Chaytor's troops were now in possession of Tel el Saba. At 15:30, orders were issued for the final assault on Beersheba; the 1st Light Horse Brigade was tasked with capturing a line from a prominent mound outside to the Beersheba mosque. Beersheba was finally taken following a mounted infantry charge by the 4th Light Horse Brigade.

=== Capturing the remainder of Gaza line ===
On 1 November, the division was ordered to push the 1st Light Horse and the New Zealand Brigades further north of Beersheba towards Tel el Khuweilfe with the 2nd Light Horse Brigade moved towards Dhaheriye on their right. The troops moving north skirmished with Ottoman cavalry then occupied a position between the Makhrune well and Towal Abu Jerwal, capturing four machine-guns and 180 prisoners. Overnight, the 1st Light Horse Brigade was ordered towards Tel el Khuweilfe, moving between the 2nd Light Horse Brigade on their right and the 7th Mounted Brigade to the left. When they reached the British line they relieved the yeomanry and at 11:00 they fought off a counter-attack by two Turkish infantry companies. They remained in the line until 16:00 when the 53rd (Welsh) Division and the 5th Mounted Brigade relieved them. During these first two days of fighting, water was in short supply and each brigade was relieved in turn to march back eleven miles (18 km) to water. This continued until 5 November when the 2nd Light Horse Brigade and the New Zealand Brigade's were ordered back to Beersheba. By 7 November, the 1st and 2nd Light Horse Brigades were located to the west of Sheria, while the New Zealand Brigade remained temporarily attached to the 53rd (Welsh) Division, which was still fighting at Khuweilfe. Later that day, during the breakthrough of the old Gaza to Beersheba line, the ANZAC Mounted Division advanced to Ameida where the 1st Light Horse Brigade captured an ammunition supply train, a field hospital, a large quantity of stores and 391 prisoners. At 12:30, news of the fall of Gaza reached Chaytor and he was ordered towards Jemmameh, to cut off the retreating Turkish forces, capturing the village of Dilakh in the process. Here the 2nd Light Horse Brigade was ordered to attack; the 5th Light Horse Regiment galloped the one point five miles (2.4 km) through exploding shells to capture part of the village, which they held through the night. The guns shelling them were located nearby; at dawn the following day they secured the rest of the village and captured the guns. Chaytor's plans to advance depended on the Australian Mounted Division moving up to join them, but by 16:30 on 7 November, they were still engaged in fighting at Hareira and Sheria and their horses had not been watered for some time. Early on 8 November, the 2nd Light Horse Brigade occupied a line from the Nejile mound to the Wadi Hesi and an hour later the 7th Mounted Brigade – still attached to the division – arrived as reinforcements. As the division advanced, they saw retreating Ottoman soldiers and at 15:00 the 1st Light Horse Brigade captured Jemmameh and its water supply. Positioned beyond the village, the 5th and 7th Light Horse Regiments were attacked by between five and seven thousand men, supported by artillery. The attack lasted the remainder of the day but petered out overnight. By the evening of 8 November, all the Turkish positions on the Gaza-Beersheba line had been captured and the Turkish Army was withdrawing northwards.

=== Judean plain ===
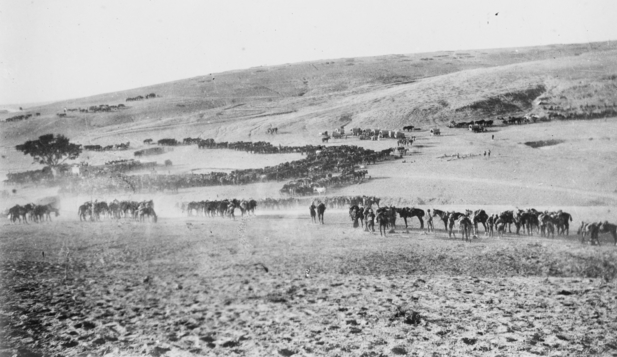
Horses queue for water at Jemmameh 8 November 1917

After watering their horses overnight on 8/9 November, the division was the only mounted force ready to move by morning. At 06:00, Chaytor ordered the advance onto the Judean plain; the 1st Light Horse Brigade on the left rode towards Simsim and the 2nd Light Horse Brigade on the right towards Bureir, with the 7th Mounted Brigade as reserve. Several large groups of Turkish soldiers were captured without resistance; however during the day, opposition increased as the two withdrawing Turkish armies became more organised. In the face of machine-gun and artillery fire the village of Bureir, along with two howitzers and stores, were captured. Continuing their advance, the 2nd Light Horse Brigade bypassed Huleikat and headed towards Kaukabah, capturing 110 wagons and 390 prisoners. Having outdistanced their lines of communication, the brigade waited in the village under shellfire for three hours for their supply trains to reach them. Then, sighting a convoy at Kustine, the brigade galloped through machine-gun and artillery fire to capture another one hundred wagons and three hundred prisoners. Turkish artillery opened fire on them but the brigade was ordered to hold its ground. Just after dark. part of the 7th Light Horse Regiment was attacked by Turkish infantry; but a Turkish speaking light horse officer convinced them they were surrounded and 230 men surrendered. Brigadier-General Granville Ryrie, GOC 2nd Light Horse Brigade, was conscious of his troops exposed position and ordered a withdrawal to Es Suafir el Gharbiye, during which they skirmished with Turkish infantry and captured another four howitzers at Ebdis. On 10 November, the 2nd Light Horse Brigade was relieved by the 75th Division and moved to Hamame on the coast for three days rest.

On the other flank, at 09:00, the 1st Light Horse Brigade entered Bureir unopposed and continued on, arriving at Mejdel at 14:00 and capturing 164 prisoners. Beit Duras was held in strength so brigade headed for the coast, stopping for the night south of Esdud. On 10 November, they moved on Isdud – the ancient Ashdod – opposed by Turkish cavalry to the north and east of the town. By 10:00, they had secured the Jisr Isdud stone bridge over the Wadi Sukereir in front of the village. However, they were confronted by a strong Turkish defence line stretching from Beit Duras to El Butani el Gharbiye and to the mouth of the Wadi Sukereir. Not having the numbers to break the line, the brigade dug in to wait for the infantry to catch up. On 11 November, the brigade left Esdud to secure the area along the Wadi Sukereir between the bridge and the sea. They subsequently located an ample supply of fresh water and a beach suitable for landing supplies from the sea. The 2nd Light Horse Regiment advanced towards the bridge, while the 1st Light Horse Regiment moved to the left and at Burka they established a line of defence along the Wadi el Khubb facing north-east. Under fire, the 2nd Light Horse Regiment crossed the bridge and gradually forced the Turkish rearguard back. By nightfall, they had occupied the Tel el Murre mound and established a substantial bridgehead over the Sukereir at the Esdud bridge towards Burkha.

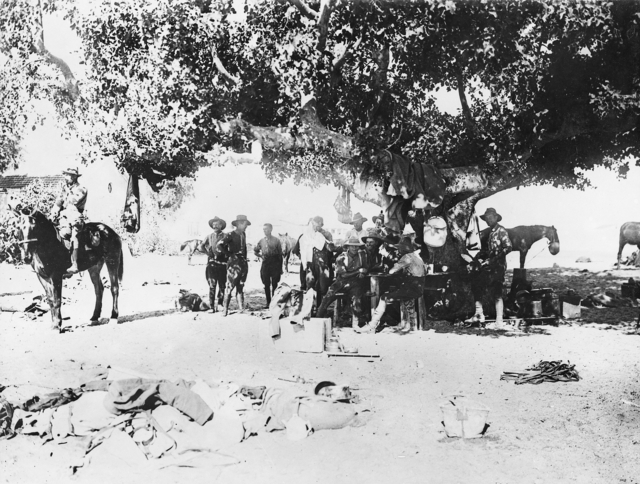
New Zealand Brigade headquarters outside Jaffa

On 12 November, the 156th (Scottish Rifles) Brigade attacked Burkha – with the 1st and 2nd Light Horse Regiments in support to their left – using their machine-guns to enfilade the Turkish rearguard trenches. The next day, the 1st and the New Zealand Brigades followed behind the Yeomanry Mounted Division, supporting their advance on Yebna to reach the mouth of the Wadi Rubin. On 14 November, the division resumed their advance. The New Zealanders on the left headed towards Jaffa, reaching the Wadi Hanein before meeting any opposition. The 1st Light Horse Brigade, on the right, headed towards Ramleh; they reached Deiran unopposed but saw Turkish troops heading towards the New Zealand Brigade. At 12:00, the New Zealanders were engaged with German machine-gun and rifle fire from a strongly defended line at Ayun Kara. During the following Battle of Ayun Kara, the Wellington Mounted Rifles put in a bayonet charge, capturing two machine-guns and killing twenty defenders. The Auckland Mounted Rifles to their left could not break through the German rearguard, which was being rapidly reinforced. While they were being shelled at 14:30, the regiment was attacked by 1,500 troops. The Auckland Mounted Rifles commanding officer requested urgent reinforcements and a squadron from the Wellington Mounted Rifles was sent to assist. By 16:00, the Turkish rearguard had advanced close enough for a bayonet and grenade charge, which the Auckland Mounted Rifles managed to hold, forcing the attackers to withdraw leaving 162 dead and a large number of wounded behind. New Zealand casualties were twenty-one dead and eighty-eight wounded.

On 15 November, the division's reconnaissance patrols reported the way ahead was clear. They resumed their advance led by the 1st Light Horse Brigade, which reached Ramleh at 11:00 unopposed. The 1st Light Horse Regiment moved ahead to reach Lydda three miles (4.8 km) further north, where reports of Turkish soldiers nearby were received. Lieutenant-colonel Cecil Granville in command ordered two troops to investigate, and forty troopers rode out to locate them and charged a hostile column while under artillery and machine-gun fire. They captured four machine-guns, 297 Turkish and two German soldiers, and sustained one dead and six wounded. On their left, the New Zealand Brigade reached Rishon LeZion and continued towards Jaffa but was ordered to halt a few miles short of the port by EEF GHQ. The following morning, the Wellington Mounted Rifles was ordered to send reconnaissance patrols towards Jaffa. Meeting no resistance, the patrols rode into the city, which had been evacuated; Chaytor told Allenby that the city had been taken. Other reconnaissance patrols were sent to the River Auju, which was found to be thirty-five feet (11 m) wide and up to ten feet (3.0 m) deep. Three crossing points were found; a shallow ford near the river mouth, a second crossing near a dam over a bridge at Khurbet Hadra, and a third crossing was located at a watermill beside Jerisheh. On the opposite bank Turkish infantry could be clearly seen digging defences.

=== River Auja ===
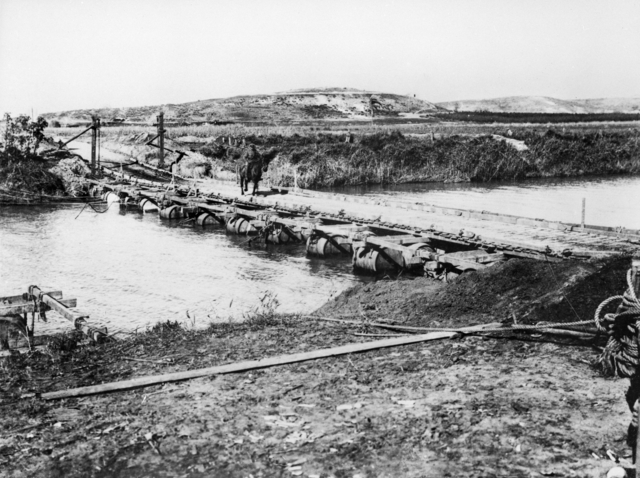
Bridge over the River Auja, north-east of Jaffa

While the main effort of the EEF headed north-west towards Jerusalem, by 20 November the division had established a line of observation posts along the River Auja a few miles north of Jaffa, stretching from Nalin at its eastern end, through Budrus and El Yehudiyeh, then along higher ground south of the Sheik Abu ex Zeitun mound and to the coast. When the 54th (East Anglian) Division and the ICCB arrived, the 1st Brigade was sent to the rear to rest at Yebna. The next day, the New Zealanders were relieved by the 161st (Essex) Brigade, but remained near the front ready for an assault on the river crossings. During this time, mounted patrols advanced to the three crossings and the nearby villages but met with strong resistance. On 24 November, following a bombardment of the Turkish defensive line, the Canterbury Mounted Rifles forced a crossing at the river mouth ford, defeated a small party of Turkish soldiers and occupied Sheikh Muannis. They were followed across by the Wellington Mounted Rifles, which moved through the Canterbury Mounted Rifles to capture the Khurbet Hadrah bridge. Once the bridge was secured, they were relieved by an infantry battalion, which took over the defences while a squadron of the Canterbury Mounted Rifles guarded the ford and the Auckland Mounted Rifles advanced in front of the infantry holding the bridge. At dawn on 25 November, a Turkish force of around one thousand men attacked the Auckland Mounted Rifles, which was forced to withdraw back to the infantry positions. At the same time, the Canterbury Mounted Rifles counter-attacked the Turkish right but the determined Turkish attackers forced the New Zealand Brigade and infantry back across the Auja. On 27 November, further Turkish advances forced the 4th (ANZAC) Battalion ICCB and the 2nd Brigade back from their position on the right. Over the next few days, trench raids were carried out by both sides, lasting until 7 December when the division handed over their sector of the front to the 52nd (Lowland) Division. The 1st and 2nd Brigades were withdrawn to the rear but the New Zealand Brigade remained at the front in reserve.

=== Jericho ===
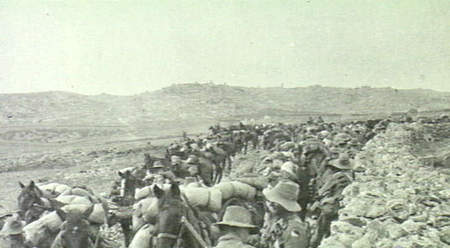
3rd Light Horse Regiment outside Bethlehem

In February 1918, the division – less the 2nd Light Horse Brigade – was attached to the XX Corps for the advance into the Jordan Valley. During the advance across the Judean Hills and down into the valley to the Dead Sea, the division was tasked with holding the right flank south from Bethlehem and outflank any Turkish defenders confronting the advance.

The British advance started on 14 February; five days later the division was established at El Muntar, six miles (9.7 km) west of the Dead Sea. Early on 20 February, the New Zealand Brigade conducted dismounted assaults on the hills Jebel el Kahmum and Tubk el Kaneiterah east of Bethlehem. Both hills were heavily defended and covered by artillery and machine-guns. They found the going heavy and the Turkish defenders did not pull back until the hills were outflanked by the 60th (London) Division advancing to the north. Just after 14:00, the two divisions were closing in on the Jordan Valley when a troop from the 1st Light Horse Regiment reached the valley floor. They were soon followed by the remainder of the 1st Light Horse Brigade, with orders to advance north to the Wadi Jofet Zeben. Plans were formed for a joint attack on Nebi Musa, but the Turkish defenders withdrew that night. Instead the 1st Light Horse Brigade headed for Jericho, and at 08:00 the 3rd Light Horse Regiments entered the town virtually unopposed. The brigade pushed on towards the River Jordan and the bridge at Ghoraniye, and by nightfall the two brigades' and the division's artillery were positioned around the bridge. They were relieved the next day by the infantry and arrived back at Bethlehem in the early hours of 23 February. The division left the Auckland Mounted Rifles, with a subsection of machine guns and an artillery battery – under command of the 60th Division – in the Jordan Valley holding a strong position where the road from Jerusalem falls into the valley.

=== Amman Raid / Bridging the River Jordan ===
The division's next operation was a raid on Amman, thirty miles (48 km) east-north-east of Jericho, by the division, with the ICCB attached, supported by the 60th Division. Heavy rain delayed the operation for several days but by 20 March, the weather improved and the level of the flooded River Jordan dropped. The Turks and the swift river thwarted British bridging units from crossing on the direct route to Amman at Ghoraniye. But further downstream at Hajla, on the night of 21–22 March, D Field Troop, Australian engineers, commanded by Captain E.J. Howells, with help from the 3rd Light Horse, rafted over infantry from the 23rd Battalion of Londoners, and then forced the first bridge across the Jordan, At 04:00 the morning of the 23rd, the Auckland Mounted Rifles Regiment crossed the bridge, turned north and attacked the rear of the Turkish troops that were preventing the crossing at Ghoraniye. By midday, the Aucklanders had secured the east bank and captured four machine-guns and sixty-eight prisoners, allowing the British to bridge the river there.

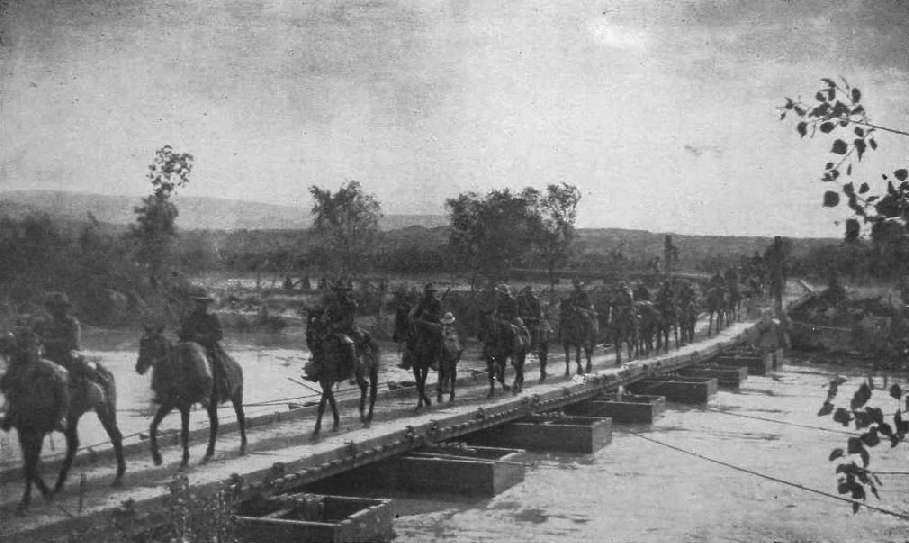
New Zealand Mounted Rifles crossing the River Jordan

The rest of the division crossed the river during the night. The 1st Light Horse Brigade, providing flank protection for 60th Division, went north to locate the track to Es Salt, which is twenty miles (32 km) north-east of Jericho but at an altitude 3,940 feet (1,200 m) higher. Leading the remainder of the force, the 2nd Light Horse Brigade advanced to Amman in the east. At 11:00, several hundred Turkish cavalry were sighted east of the 2nd Light Horse Brigade. The GOC Ryrie and the 6th Light Horse Regiment attempted to cut them off but they escaped in the rugged terrain. At 15:00, the brigade regrouped and set out for the Hekr spring on the plain. Finding the tracks unsuitable for wheeled transport, the division's artillery and supply train had to remain behind. This caused a delay while essential stores were transferred to camels. The advance resumed at 21:30; at times the troopers had to dismount and lead their horses along the tracks, through heavy rain which began to fall at 02:00 on 25 March. The first troops reached Ain el Hekr at 04:00 and waited for the rest of the division to arrive, and at 19:30 the 2nd Light Horse Brigade moved out again across the plateau. Even on the flat progress was slow, the camels slipping in the rain and the wet conditions, slowed the horsemen. Soon after observing a Turkish convoy in the distance, the 5th Light Horse Regiment was ordered to attack. The convoy of nineteen lorries, three cars, one armoured car and several other vehicles was captured along with twelve prisoners. Another patrol from the 6th Light Horse Regiment captured sixty-one prisoners at Suweile. (Note: Powles claims there were nineteen lorries and one car abandoned by the Es Salt garrison fleeing from 60th Division.) Just before dawn, the 7th Light Horse Regiment leading met up with the New Zealand Brigade, which had travelled independently via the Shunet Nimrin road. The New Zealanders route had been easier than that used by the main force. Chaytor, aware that his men had not rested for three days and nights, postponed the assault for twenty-four hours.

During this rest period, on the night of 26 March Chaytor ordered the railway lines north and south of Amman to be cut to prevent any escape or reinforcement by rail. The New Zealanders destroyed a section of rail seven miles (11 km) long to the south, while the 2nd Light Horse Brigade was confronted by Turkish cavalry and could not reach the northern rail line. Early on 27 March the division advanced to Amman, supported by a four-gun lightweight mountain artillery battery from the ICCB. (Note: Mountain artillery guns had a high angle of fire and were light, easily dismantled, to be carried by man or animal.) At Amman, the Turkish Army had four thousand infantry in well-constructed defences dug in along the heights, looking down on the division. Supported by fifteen artillery pieces and machine-guns, the New Zealand Mounted Rifles Brigade to the right were to cross the Wadi Amman and assault the hills between Amman and the railway station. The 1st and 2nd Battalions, ICCB would assault Amman from the front while the 2nd Light Horse Brigade to their left would circle around north and approach Amman from the rear. The New Zealand Brigade met with heavy machine-gun fire and were not in position to attack until 15:00. The 2nd Light Horse Brigade dismounted just under two miles (3.2 km) from Amman and approached on foot. Advancing through shell and machine-gun fire, the brigade reached within six hundred yards (550 m) of the village before they were forced to withdraw. It was the same with the camel battalions; in the face of heavy machine-gun fire they were also stopped. On the right, the New Zealanders attack also failed, and during the afternoon they observed a train arriving from the south, which a prisoner confirmed contained three hundred reinforcements. During that night, the New Zealand Brigade stopped a Turkish bayonet charges.

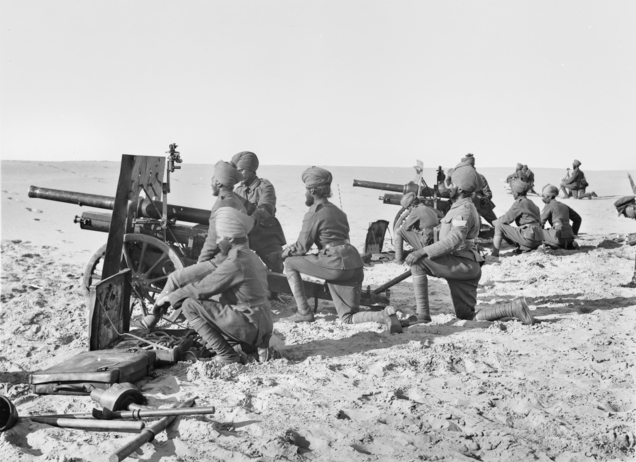
The Imperial Camel Corps Brigade artillery battery that supported the division at Amman

While this was going on, at 15:00 the Wellington Mounted Rifles and the 4th (ANZAC) Battalion ICCB were destroying five miles (8.0 km) of railway line and several culverts to the south-east. That night, the 5th Light Horse Regiment was sent seven miles (11 km) north of Amman to destroy a railway bridge. Amman was now cut off from reinforcements by rail but the previous day's fighting convinced Chaytor that his force was not strong enough to take Amman alone. To their north the 1st Light Horse Brigade and 60th Division had captured Es Salt and were defending it against counter-attacks. The GOC 60th Division, Major-general John Shea, ordered the 181st (2/6th London) Brigade and two batteries of mountain guns to Amman. After they arrived early on 28 March, Chaytor decided to attack again. The assault began at 13:00 and was again defeated by heavy gunfire. On 29 March, having repaired the railway track, a train of Turkish reinforcement arrived at Amman from the north. Chaytor decided to order a night attack and at 02:00 on 30 March, the division attacked and had some success, but eight hours later, by 10:00 it was clear the attack would not succeed. But it was not until four hours later, soon after 14:00, it was decided to call off the battle and return to the Jordan valley.

The division's casualties, including the ICCB, were heavy – 128 dead, 551 wounded and fifty-five missing, which was 248 more than those of the much larger 60th Division. (Note: Preston gives the casualty total for the whole operation as 1,600 dead, wounded and missing.) The division captured 615 prisoners, ten machine-guns, two field kitchens, twenty-six lorries, five cars, several horse-drawn wagons and the New Zealanders captured an aeroplane. During the battle, the division fired over 587,000 rounds of small arms ammunition (SAA).

=== Ghoraniye bridge-head ===
On 2 April, Chaytor was given command of the Jordan Valley defences, consisting of the division, the ICCB, two batteries of 4.5-inch howitzers and two heavier 60-pounders. The 1st Light Horse Brigade, with the 5th Light Horse Regiment attached, was established on the east bank of the Jordan River. The ICCB, with the 6th and 7th Light Horse Regiments attached, was holding a line at Abu Tellul and stretching along the Wadi Mellahah. Daily the defenders saw Turkish patrols but were not attacked, and the division spent their days digging trenches, stringing barbed wire and siting machine-guns. The New Zealand Brigade was further west in the valley between Jericho and the Jordan river.

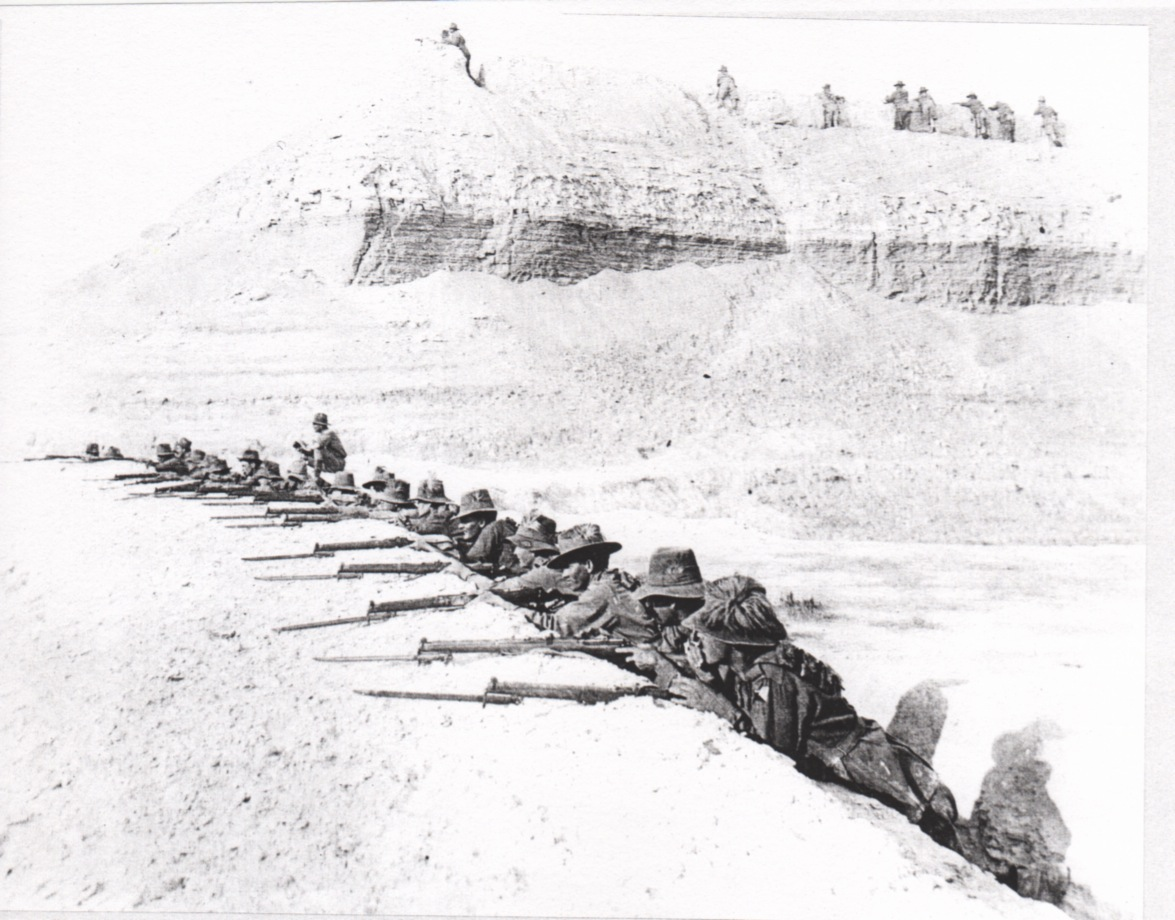
The 5th Light Horse Regiment defending the Ghoraniye bridge-head

Then on 11 April the defences on the Wadi Nimrin and in the hills at Musallabeh were attacked by a large Turkish force. A patrol from the 2nd Light Horse Regiment discovered a Turkish unit of around 100 men, on the left bank of the Wadi Nimrin at 04:30. By dawn there were one thousand infantrymen approaching, in waves about six hundred yards (550 m) long, on both sides of the wadi. They got to within one hundred yards (91 m) of the barbed wire defences before the division's guns opened fire. By now the Turkish force was estimated at two thousand men. At 13:00 Brigadier-General Charles Frederick Cox GOC 1st Light Horse Brigade ordered the 1st and 3rd Light Horse Regiments to ride out and encircle them. But their strength, in men and machine-guns, was such that the mounted troopers could not approach them. Sporadic firing continued all night but by 04:00 12 April the Turkish force had withdrawn. Turkish casualties were fifty-one dead, 550 wounded and ninety unwounded prisoners. The brigade had seven dead and seventeen wounded.

At Musallabeh to the north at 04:30 the crossing was subjected to a heavy artillery barrage, with infantry following close behind. At 05:00 the barrage lifted and the Turkish infantry attack the outnumbered ICCB, and attached light horse regiments. For the next three hours at close quarters a fire fight ensued. At 08:00 the attack petered out, but the defenders were still subjected to sniper and artillery fire. Another attack in the afternoon also failed, and they withdrew leaving 170 dead. The ICCB and light horse casualties were eighteen dead and twenty-seven wounded. (Note: Powles gives the division's casualties as twenty-six killed and sixty-five wounded, and at a "rough estimate" 2,500 for the Turkish.)

=== Es Salt raid ===
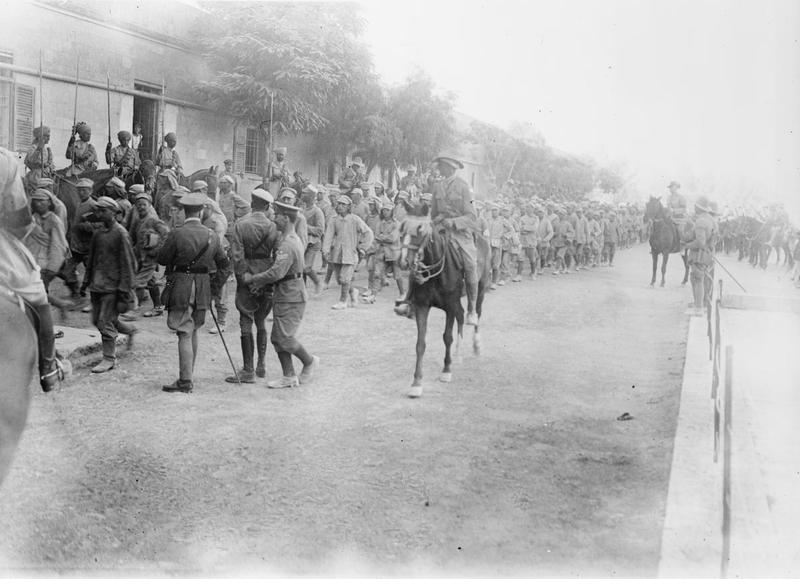
German prisoners taken during the raid escorted by the ANZAC Mounted Division and the Imperial Service Cavalry Brigade.

On 18 April, the division crossed the Jordan valley to attack the Turkish troops at Shunet Nimrin in the nearby foot-hills. Their orders were "to inflict losses on the enemy and to convey the impression that we are about to advance again to Amman". The brigades, supported by artillery and armoured cars, were confronted by strong Turkish defences and that night withdrew back across the river. The incursion was ordered by Allenby; the result was the Turkish sending reinforcements to the area and strengthening their defences.

Two days later, Chaytor received orders for another attack across the Jordan on Shunet Nimrin and Es Salt. This time, commanded by Chauvel, the division would be again joined by the 60th Division, and by the Australian Mounted Division, the ICCB, the Imperial Service Cavalry Brigade and the 20th Indian Brigade. The division, less the 2nd Light Horse Brigade, was to support the 60th Division in a minor role. The force crossed the Jordan overnight on 29/30 April. The division supported the 60th Division's, assaults on Shunet Nimrin, but they could not break the Turkish position. Shea the GOC 60th Division used the ANZAC brigades on his flanks, but they were prevented from getting forward by the strong defences in the rugged terrain. All except a squadron from the 6th Light Horse Regiment attached to the 179th (2/4th London) Brigade.

Elsewhere, the force was involved in heavy fighting against strong Turkish defences; during a counter-attack it lost more than two batteries of artillery, which was captured by the advancing Turkish soldiers. On 1 May, 60th Division was supposed to attack Shunet Nimrin again but failures elsewhere caused the assault to be cancelled. Instead, the Australian Mounted Division which had advanced to occupy Es Salt, sent the 5th Mounted Brigade to attack Shunet Nimrin from the rear. To assist them, the 1st Light Horse Brigade was sent to cut off any retreat from there northwards. The Australian attack faltered, partly in response to Turkish successes in the west, and by 20:00 they were still stationary. Another frontal assault by 60th (London) Division at 02:00 on 2 May also failed; by now the British position was turning more to defence than attack. In the three days since crossing the Jordan valley, the force had been involved in almost continuous fighting. On 3 May, yet another frontal attack by 60th Division failed and the ANZAC Division covering the flanks were confronted by growing numbers of Turkish troops. At 16:00 on 3 May, with an acceptance of the need to save his command, Chauvel ordered a withdrawal back from Es Salt to the Jordan valley. The last unit to cross back across the Jordan was the New Zealand Brigade, leaving the Auckland and Wellington Mounted Rifles as the east bank guard force, along with the Ghoraniyeh bridgehead.

The operation failed in its objectives, only resulting in the capture of one thousand prisoners. Casualties for the two mounted divisions were comparability light at fifty dead and 310 wounded, while the 60th Division suffered 1,116 casualties.

=== Summer in the Jordan Valley ===
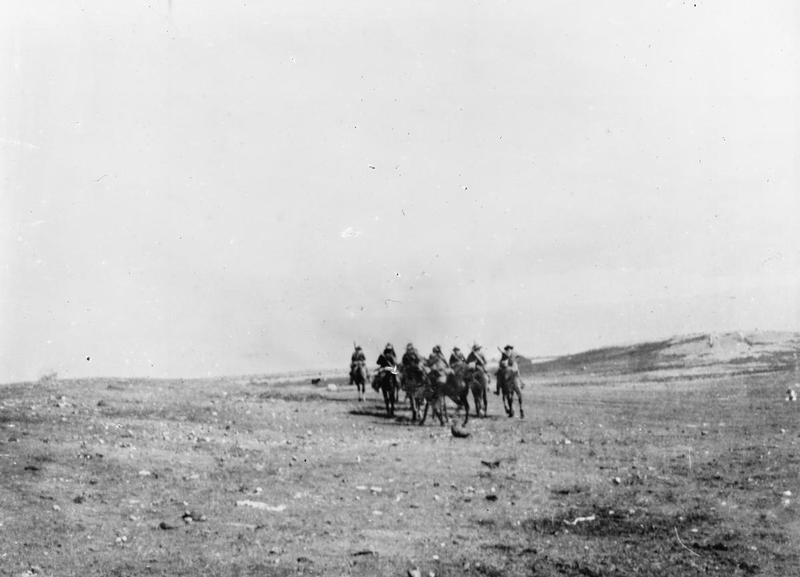
New Zealand Brigade patrol in the Jordan Valley.

In normal times, no one lived in the Jordan Valley during the warmer months of the year; the residents of Jericho left the village for the cooler hills. The residents said it was impossible for Europeans to live there after April. To prevent the Turkish Army from re-occupying the valley, Allenby had to keep a defence force in place. To that end, the division patrolled the southern sector, which included Ghoraniye and the Dead Sea. The division was reinforced by the Imperial Service Cavalry Brigade and the 181st (2/6th London) Brigade. The infantry held the Ghoraniye bridgehead on the eastern side of the Jordan river. Because of the severe climate, there was little daylight activity during the summer. Patrols would normally be sent out at night, often returning in the morning after encountering Turkish cavalry trying to reach the Jordan to water their horses. The divisions were sent, in turn, to rest at Bethlehem and were given leave in Jerusalem. During this time, the division conducted training camps for non-commissioned officers, Hotchkiss machine-gunners and signallers, and all ranks took part in general military training. However, the troops left in the valley were being beginning to suffer from "malaria and other diseases".

In June, the 1st Light Horse Brigade returned from Bethlehem and replaced the 4th Light Horse Brigade in the Musallabeh sector. The brigade deployed with two regiments forward and one in reserve at the Wadi el Auja front line. By early July, they had 3rd Light Horse Regiment on the left, 2nd Light Horse Regiment on the right and the 1st Light Horse Regiment in reserve. Because of illness and a lack of replacements, the 3rd Light Horse Regiment had only 210 men available and the other regiments were in a similar condition. Since they arrived, the brigade had been subjected to Turkish shelling. Activity then increased to such an extent that a Turkish attack was expected at any time. In preparation, extra water and ammunition – enough for two days – was cached in the defence posts. On 13 April, Turkish artillery fire on the brigades' positions increased and that night, movement could be head at the barbed wire defence line. At 01:00 on 14 April, the forward troops reported that the enemy appeared to be massing, and later a "strong body of troops" about 1,000 yards (910 m) to their front. Lieutenant-colonel George John Bell, commanding 3rd Light Horse Regiment asked for a protective artillery barrage in front of his position. The Turkish responded with shelling of their own, which lifted at 02:30. In the quiet, the regiment heard some commands shouted in German. Then the Turkish artillery laid down another one-hour barrage. When that lifted, around one thousand troops attacked the brigade's forward defences in what became known as the battle of Abu Tellul. In the 2nd Light Horse Regiment's sector, some forward posts were withdrawn to safer areas. Regimental headquarters was overrun and other positions surrounded. Other troops were overrun but regained their posts by counter-attacking. Further west, a position held by the regimental adjutant, a signals officer, grooms, batmen and signallers, was all that remained between the attacking Germans and the division's artillery batteries. Troops were then withdrawn to a trench line below a crest so the attacking Germans coming over the skyline were easily targeted and the brigade held off the attack for the next hour.

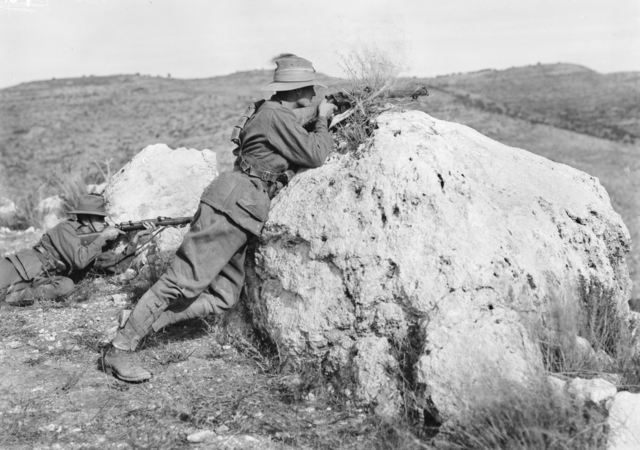
Riflemen form the 3rd Light Horse Regiment

Chaytor, informed of the attack, sent a squadron from the 4th Light Horse Brigade – which was still close by – to reinforce the position. Cox, commanding 1st Light Horse Brigade, ordered the 1st Light Horse Regiment – his only reserve – to counter-attack the Germans. At 03:30, one squadron and four machine-guns were sent to reinforce the position at Abu Tellul. At dawn on 14 April, it became clear that the main German assault was centred on Abu Tellul, so two more squadrons were sent to assist them. The reinforcements assembled below the crest, fixed bayonets and counter-attacked the Germans, whom taken by surprise, broke and withdrew to their own trenches. The position at Abu Tellul was now secure but on the other flank in the west, the German attack was progressing. At 08:00, the last reserve squadron counter-attacked there, forcing the Germans back and capturing one hundred prisoners. By 09:00, the brigade was back in control of its previous positions and the New Zealand Mounted Rifles Brigade moved to sweep clear one thousand yards (910 m) to their front. The battle cost the Germans 105 dead, and 358 prisoners; another sixty-seven Turkish prisoners were captured. One group of one hundred captured German Stormtroopers were armed with forty-two automatic rifles – the German equivalent of the Hotchkiss – almost one between every two men. The brigade casualties were twenty-three dead and forty-six wounded. Ammunition expended by the brigade was 19,000 rifle rounds, 20,000 Hotchkiss and 30,000 machine gun rounds.

=== Chaytor's Force ===
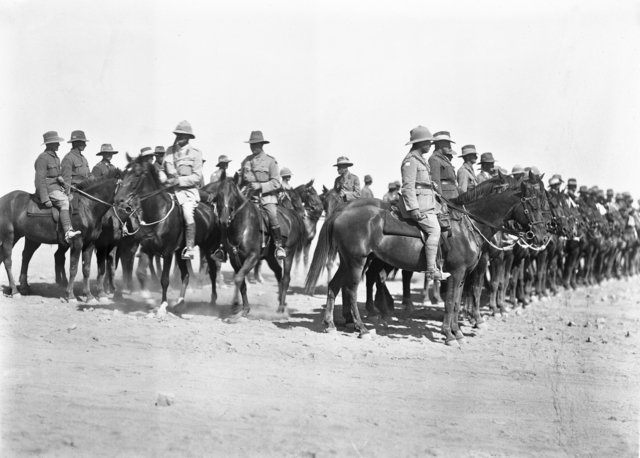
General Sir Edmund Allenby, C-in-C of the EEF, inspects officers and men of the ANZAC Mounted Division, to whom he was about to present decorations, Palestine, August 1918.

In September 1918, British intelligence reported that the Turkish Fourth Army, comprising six thousand infantrymen and two thousand cavalry with 74 artillery pieces, was still east of the Jordan. Further south at Ma'an was the Fourth Army's four to six thousand-man II Corps. However Allenby planned that the next offensive would take place on the coastal Sharon plain and in the Judean Hills near Nablus. To accomplish that, the EEF had to realign to the left flank and convince the opposition that the main attack would take place in the Jordan Valley. To allow this to happen, the division remained in the valley as the main component of Chaytor's Force – the division reinforced by the 20th Indian Brigade, Jewish Legion (38th and 39th Battalions, Royal Fusiliers), and 1st and 2nd Battalions, British West Indies Regiment and support troops. (Note: Also included was a transport echelon of 300 donkeys, seventeen tractors, thirty-four trucks, five ammunition lorries and fourteen supply lorries.) Chaytor's Force was responsible for holding the eastern flank in the Jordan Valley. While the EEF moved west, the force built new and larger camps and 15,000 dummy horses. At the same time, the infantry battalions marched around the valley, giving the illusion of a much larger force, and constructed false bridges across the Jordan. Part of Chaytor's orders were to conduct patrols east of the Jordan; if there was evidence of a Turkish withdrawal, they were to head north and capture the crossing at Damieh and east to seize Amman and block the Fourth Army's retreat north to Damascus. While the Australian Mounted Division, which was advancing along the coast as part of the main drive towards Damascus, had received swords and cavalry training in August 1918, the ANZAC Mounted Division did not, and continued in the mounted rifles role until the end of the war.

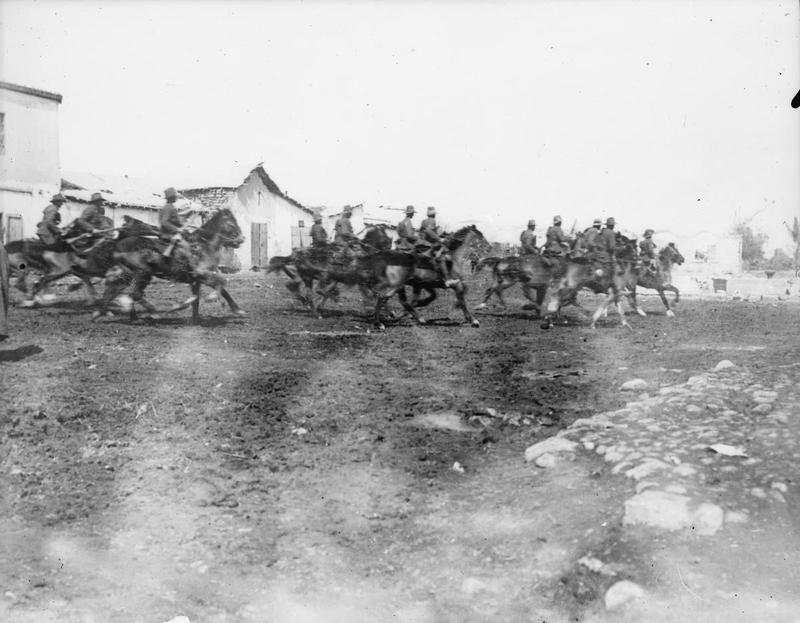
Galloping New Zealand troops in the Jordan Valley

The force was divided to cover the Jordan Valley. The 2nd Light Horse and 20th Indian Brigades held a line between the Dead Sea along the Jordan to the Auja bridgehead. The New Zealand Brigade and the other four infantry battalions held the line from Auja to Mellahah and Ahu Tellul, while the 1st Light Horse Brigade was in reserve at Jericho. Over the nights of 17–19 September, the divisions' patrols crossed east of the river and were involved in several fire fights with the defenders. During daylight on 19 September, the two West Indian battalions carried out bayonet charges and captured Turkish positions west of the river. An attempt by the Royal Fusiliers failed to gain any ground. Throughout the next day, the Turkish defenders fought hard against any attack. On 21 September, the Auckland Mounted Rifles advanced to the north on the western side of the river towards the Damieh bridge and Mafid Jozele, forcing the Turkish troops to withdraw to their reserve line. On 22 September at 03:30, on the left the New Zealand Brigade and mounted West Indies infantry battalions reached the Nablus–Damieh road and reached the Mazar mound an hour later. They next captured El Makhruk along with a large supply dump, seventy vehicles and 724 prisoners – one of which was the GOC of the Turkish 53rd Division. Before daylight, they captured the Damieh bridge with a dismounted attack during which one of the West Indies companies charged with them. The Fourth Army units, leaving small rear guards behind, now started to withdraw from the east bank towards Amman, pursued by the 1st Light Horse Brigade, a West Indian battalion and the Royal Fusiliers battalions. They became involved in several small fights as they tried to turn the Turkish to their front, back towards the river. That night, Chaytor issued orders for a general advance the next day. In the south, the 2nd Light Horse Brigade's objectives were Kabr Mujahid and the Rame mound. The 20th Brigade, the Royal Fusiliers battalions and a light horse squadron would take Shunet Ninirin. The 1st Light Horse Brigade would capture a crossing on the Jordan at Mafid Jozele, forcing the Seventh Army back into the hills. The New Zealand Brigade were to gallop to Es Salt followed by the West Indies battalions on foot. The division's artillery, supply train and all wheeled vehicles would travel along the road from Shunet Nimrin to Es Salt.

Chaytor's Force advanced on 23 September; by 04:30, 2nd Light Horse Brigade had taken their first objective and continued towards Tel er Rame. Before night they had climbed out of the foothills and onto the plateau. The 1st Light Horse Brigade forced their crossing and were en route to Es Salt. The 20th Brigade captured Shunet Nimrin and also headed towards Es Salt. The only opposition was in the north, where the New Zealand Brigade were temporarily stopped by a machine-gun post, but by 19:00 they had captured Es Salt along with 312 prisoners, two machine-guns and three artillery pieces. The 1st Light Horse and the New Zealand Mounted Rifles Brigades' now advanced on Suweile. The 2nd Light Horse Brigade had problems negotiating hill tracks – some of which had been damaged by artillery fire – but reached Ain es Sir at midday. By now, except for one battalion of fusiliers, Chaytor's Force was on the plateau around Es Salt, advancing on Amman.

To close the trap on the Fourth Army, the Auckland Mounted Rifles sent a squadron overnight on 25 September to destroy the railway line north of Amman. The rest of the division set out at 06:00 to attack Amman for a second time with the 2nd Light Horse and the New Zealand Brigades leading and the 1st Light Horse Brigade in reserve. Chaytor, being well aware of the terrain, ordered the division to move slowly and to wait for infantry support before attacking if they encountered a strong position. The New Zealand Brigade encountered around two hundred men and artillery on a ridge position north-west of Amman. The 2nd Light Horse Brigade moving along the Ain es Sir-Amman road were slowed down by several machine-gun posts, which they over-ran and captured 130 prisoners, three artillery pieces, and four machine-guns. At 11:00, a British aircraft dropped a note for Chaytor reporting that the defenders were leaving their trenches. Chaytor ordered a mounted charge by the Canterbury Mounted Rifles, but they were stopped by the terrain and machine-gun fire. For the next two hours, the brigades gradually fought their way closer to Amman. The break through came when the 7th Light Horse Regiment reached within eighty yards (73 m) of the Turkish trenches; they fixed bayonets and charged, capturing 113 prisoners and seven machine-guns. The New Zealand Brigade from the north-west had advanced close enough, so that when they crossed the Wadi Amman they charged and captured the old citadel and the Amman rail station. Within Amman, the division captured 2,360 prisoners, six artillery pieces and several machine-guns.

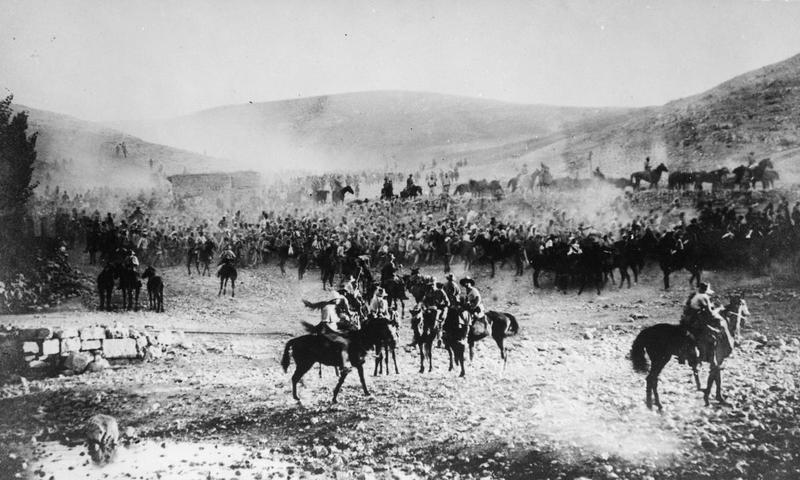
Some of the prisoners taken by the 2nd Light Horse Brigade during September 1918

About 120 miles (190 km) to the south, the Turkish II Corps – around five to six thousand strong – of the Fourth Army, were defending Ma'an from the Arab forces. To hinder their retreat north, the 2nd Light Horse Brigade was sent to cut the railway line to the south of Amman and the 1st Light Horse Brigade was sent to capture Wadi el Hammam and its water supplies. The rest of the force prepared a defence line between Shunet Nimrin, Es Salt, and Suweile. On 26 September, the 3rd Light Horse Regiment captured one hundred pro-Turkish Arabs, then reached Ez Zerka where they discovered ninety-five sick or wounded Turkish soldiers and an artillery piece. The next day, the 1st Light Horse Brigade outflanked Wadi el Hammam and captured 453 prisoners and three machine-guns, and also closed the eastern road north from Ma'an. The next day, the 2nd Light Horse Brigade moved south along the railway line and reached Leban, where a prisoner disclosed that the 6,000-man Ma'am garrison was about sixteen miles (26 km) to the south. Early on 28 September, the garrison's men were located to the south of Kastal by British aircraft, digging trenches. The 5th Light Horse Regiment was sent to reconnoitre the position, which was surrounded by the Beni Sakhr tribe who were harassing the defenders, galloping around the trenches and firing their guns in the air. Lieutenant-colonel Donald Charles Cameron commanding 5th Light Horse Regiment approached the Turkish commander about their surrender; He was in agreement but disinclined to relinquish their weapons with the Arab force present. When Chaytor was informed of their predicament, he ordered the remainder of the 2nd Light Horse Brigade south to assist. When Cameron reported to Ryrie – who was commanding the 2nd Light Horse Brigade – that the situation was becoming critical, he ordered the brigade to gallop, leaving their slower pack horses behind. The brigade arrived just before nightfall, by which time the Turkish had opened fire on the Arabs. Ryrie conferred with the Arab chiefs, who wanted to make a joint assault on the position. Instead, fearing the Arabs' intention if the Turkish surrendered, Ryrie camped inside the Turkish position for the night. The next morning at 08:00, the New Zealand Brigade arrived and a Turkish force, thirteen artillery pieces, thirty machine-guns, a train with three steam engines and five thousand men went into captivity. In the nine days since operations started, Chaytor's Force had taken 10,300 prisoners and captured fifty-seven artillery pieces, 132 machine-guns, eleven railway engines and 106 lorries. His casualties were twenty-seven dead, 105 wounded and seven men missing. (Note: Preston claims 11,000 prisoners, while Powles' figures are slightly different, listing 10,332 prisoners, 57 artillery pieces, 132 large machine guns, fifteen smaller machine guns, eleven railway engines, 106 railway trucks and carriages, and 142 vehicles of all descriptions.)

=== Disbandment ===
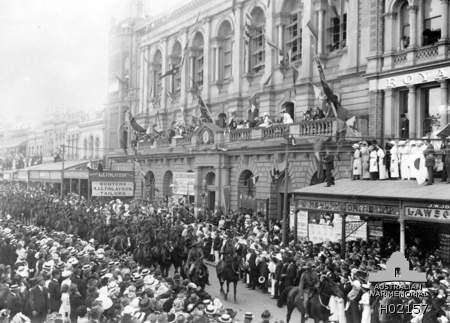
The 2nd Light Horse Regiment march through Brisbane, Queensland, in 1919

While the division withdrew, the Desert Mounted Corps in the west advanced into Syria, where it captured Damascus on 1 October, while Prince Feisal's Sherifial force captured Aleppo on 25 October. At the end of October, the Armistice of Mudros was agreed between the British and Ottoman Empires. During this time, the division was withdrawn back to Jerusalem and then Richon. At the end of hostilities, sickness caught up with the men and there were 900 "stretcher cases" laid up and several men died of disease. The 7th Light Horse and the Canterbury Mounted Rifles were selected to be part of the force – commanded by the 28th Division – that occupied the Dardanelles and Constantinople, landing on the Dardanelles peninsula on 5 December. In December 1918, Ryrie GOC 2nd Light Horse Brigade, as a brigadier-general, assumed command of the division. In early 1919, while the division was based around Rafa preparing to return home, a revolt broke out in Egypt. The 1st and 2nd Light Horse Regiments had already sailed for Australia in March, and rest of the division had returned most of their equipment to the stores and were waiting for transport ships to return them home. They were rearmed and deployed to patrolling and counter rioting duties. Within a month the revolt was over and the embarkation of the division resumed. The 3rd Light Horse Regiment left in May, the New Zealand Brigade had left by July and by the end of the summer, the rest of the division had followed. The ANZAC Mounted Division officially ceased to exist on 30 June 1919.

Immediately after the war ended, the division's horses were taken to the Imperial Remount Depot at Moascar in Egypt. The riding horses were eventually reissued, when required, to units of the British Empire. The heavier pack and draught horses were now redundant, so these were shipped to France and sold.

== Controversies ==
On 10 December 1918 after the war had ended and on the eve of going home, soldiers in the Australian and New Zealand Mounted division participated in what has become known as the Surafend massacre. Approximately 40-137 Arab civilians were killed in retaliation for the murder of 21-year-old Leslie Lowry, a trooper in the 1st New Zealand Machine Gun Squadron. Despite a military Court of Inquiry by the Egyptian Expeditionary Force headquarters concluding that there was insufficient evidence for believing that the murderer was a person in the village of Sarafand al-Amar, soldiers took matters into their own hands. Soldiers of the ANZAC Mounted Division armed themselves and attacked the men in the village. While their actions constituted serious crimes while on active service according to British military law, the division met investigators with a wall of silence that prevented anyone from ever being tried or punished for the murders. These actions cast a dark shadow over the disbandment of the ANZAC Mounted Division and Britain, Australia, and New Zealand paid £2060.11 towards rebuilding the destroyed village.

== Battles ==
=== 1916 ===
- Jifjafa, Romani, Bir el Ard, Magdhaba

=== 1917 ===
- Rafa, 1st Gaza, 2nd Gaza, Beersheba, Tel el Khuweilfe, Mughar Ridge, Ayun Kara

=== 1918 ===
- Jericho, Amman, Shunet Nimrin and Es Salt, Third Transjordan attack
