= Nalin =

Nalin is both a given name (unisex) and a surname. Notable people with the name include:

- Nalin Angammana, (1945–1995), Sri Lanka Army officer
- Nalin Bandara (born 1974), Sri Lankan politician
- Nalin Bandaranayake, Sri Lankan cricketer
- Nalin Bhatt, Gujarati politician
- Nalin Fernando (born 1973), Sri Lankan politician
- Nalin Jayawardena (born 1957), Sri Lankan singer
- Nalin Kohli, Indian politician
- Nalin Kumar Kateel (born 1966), Indian politician
- Nalin Kulatilaka, Sri Lankan academic
- Nalin Malik (1910–?), Indian swimmer
- Nalin Mazumdar, Indian guitarist
- Nalin Mehta, Indian scientist
- Nalin Mishra (born 1995), Indian cricketer
- Nalin Nipiko (born 1995), Vanuatuan cricketer
- Nalin Perera (cricketer) (born 1994), Sri Lankan cricketer
- Nalin Perera (judge) (born 1954) Sri Lankan judge
- Nalin Perera (singer) (born 1969), Sri Lankan singer
- Nalin Prabhat (born 1968), Indian Police Service officer
- Nalin Priyadarshana (born 1990), Sri Lankan cricketer
- Nalin Priyantha (born 1981), Sri Lankan high jumper
- Nalin Raval (1933–2021), Gujarati poet
- Nalin Rodrigo, Sri Lankan obstetrician
- Nalin Samarasinha (born 1958), Sri Lankan scientist
- Nalin Soren, Indian politician
- Nalin Surie, Indian civil servant
- Nalin Vilochan Sharma (1916–1961), Indian professor
- Nalin de Silva (1944–2024), Sri Lankan philosopher
- Nalin Vimukthi (born 1988), Sri Lankan cricketer
- Nalin Wijesinghe (born 1979), Sri Lankan cricketer
- David Nalin (born 1941), American physiologist
- Pan Nalin, Indian filmmaker
- Hema Nalin Karunaratne (1962–2018), Sri Lankan journalist

As feminine given name:

- Nalin Pekgul (born 1967), Swedish politician

== See also ==
- Nalin & Kane, German production and remixing team
