= Eastern Force =

Component of the British Empire's Egyptian Expeditionary Force

Eastern Force was a component in 1916, of the British Empire's Egyptian Expeditionary Force which took part in the early Sinai campaign of the Sinai and Palestine Campaign in the First World War.

Commanded by the Canadian Lieutenant-General Charles Macpherson Dobell, it included a mobile arm called the Desert Column, the ANZAC Mounted Division, the Imperial Mounted Division and the 53rd (Welsh) Division under command. Other units assigned were the Imperial Camel Corps Brigade, the 52nd (Lowland) Division and the 54th (East Anglian) Division.

== Bibliography ==
- Woodward, David R. (2006). Hell in the Holy Land: World War I in the Middle East. University Press of Kentucky. ISBN 081317144X.
