= Desert Column =

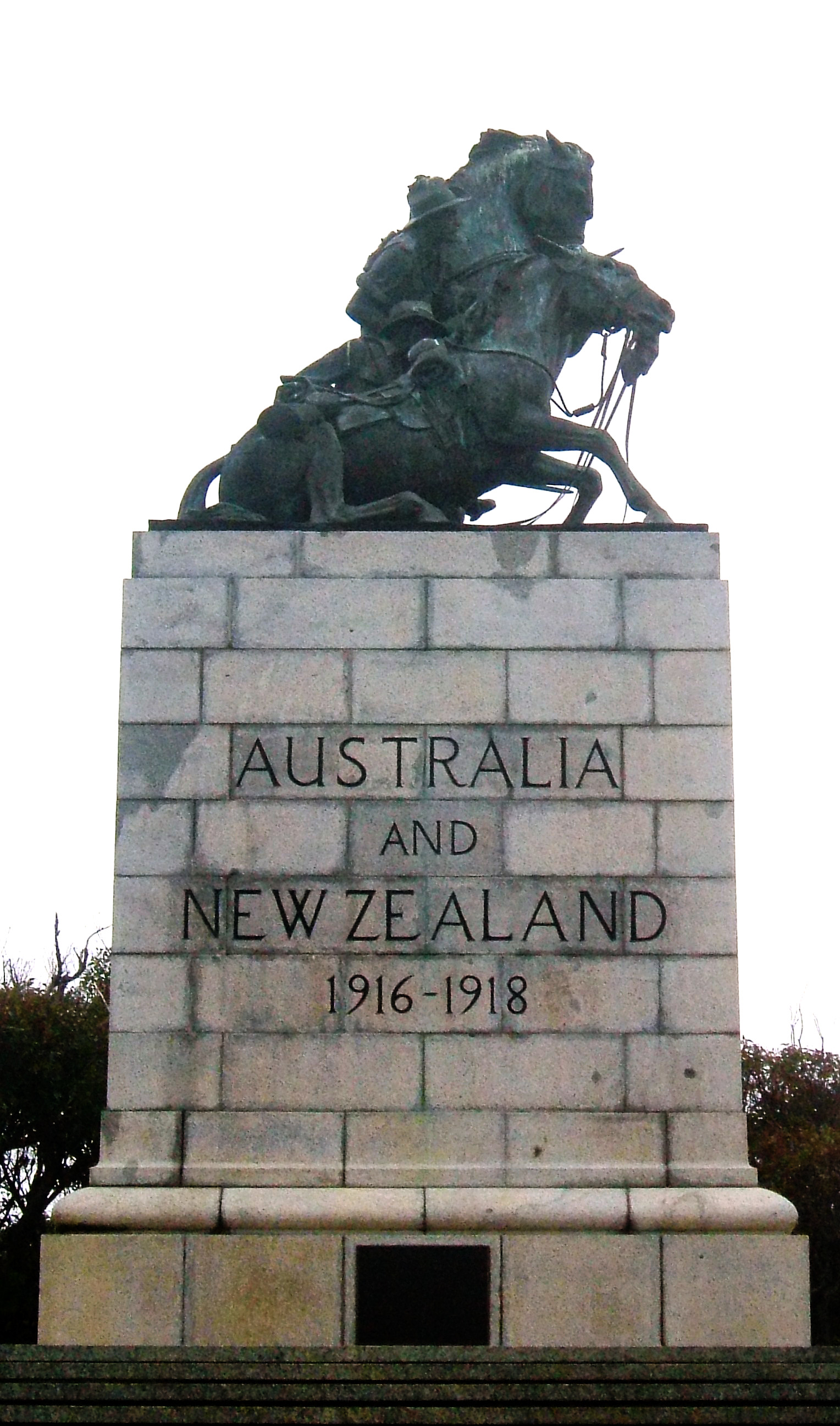
- The Desert Mounted Corps Memorial at Mount Clarence, Albany, Western Australia.
- Active: 1916–1917
- Country: Australia; British Empire; New Zealand
- Type: Light horse, mounted rifle, infantry
- Role: Mounted infantry, infantry
- Part of: Egyptian Expeditionary Force, Eastern Force
- Engagements: World War I: Sinai and Palestine Campaign; Battle of Rafa; First Battle of Gaza; Second Battle of Gaza

Commanders
- Notable commanders: Philip W. Chetwode

The Desert Column was a First World War British Empire army corps which operated in the Sinai and Palestine Campaign from 22 December 1916. (Note: There is no war diary for Desert Column for December. See "First World War Diaries - AWM4, Sub-class 1/64 | Australian War Memorial". Archived from the original on 2 October 2013.) The Column was commanded by Lieutenant General Philip W. Chetwode and formed part of Eastern Force. When Chetwode took command of Eastern Force after the Second Battle of Gaza, Harry Chauvel took command and oversaw the expansion of the column to three divisions.

Chetwode was appointed on 7 December 1916 to command the Column which was composed of the 42nd (East Lancashire) Division, the 52nd (Lowland) Division, the Anzac Mounted Division and the Imperial Camel Brigade's eighteen companies, six of which were yeomen. These divisions had been involved in the Battle of Romani in August 1916 and had advanced across the Sinai Peninsula. Chetwode arrived at El Arish to take up his appointment on 22 December 1916. The Battle of Magdhaba was won the next day, and on 9 January 1917 the Battle of Rafa was also won by the Desert Column, before two defeats were suffered during the First and Second battles for Gaza in March and April 1917.

In mid 1917 when General Edmund Allenby took command of the Egyptian Expeditionary Force, Desert Column was renamed to become the Desert Mounted Corps commanded by Lieutenant General Chauvel.

== December 1916 ==
Desert Column Headquarters El Arish (Lieutenant General Sir Philip Chetwode)

42nd (East Lancashire) Division

125th (Lancashire Fusiliers) Brigade
126th (East Lancashire) Brigade
127th (Manchester) Brigade

52nd (Lowland) Division (Major General W.E.B. Smith)

155th (South Scottish) Brigade
156th (Scottish Rifles) Brigade
157th (Highland Light Infantry) Brigade

Anzac Mounted Division (Major General Harry Chauvel)

1st Light Horse Brigade
2nd Light Horse Brigade
3rd Light Horse Brigade
New Zealand Mounted Rifles Brigade

Imperial Camel Corps Brigade

Royal Flying Corps 5th Wing stationed at Mustabig (Lieutenant Colonel W.G.H Salmond)

No. 14 (British) Squadron
(No. 17 Squadron)
No. 1 Squadron Australian Flying Corps / No. 67 (Australian) Squadron

== Order of Battle 9 January 1917 ==
Desert Column (Lieutenant General Chetwode)

Anzac Mounted Division (Major General Chauvel)

1st Light Horse Brigade (Brigadier General C. F. Cox)
3rd Light Horse Brigade (Brigadier General J. R. Royston)
New Zealand Mounted Rifles Brigade (Brigadier General E. W. C. Chaytor)
Inverness, Leicestershire and Somerset Territorial Royal Horse Artillery batteries

Imperial Camel Corps Brigade

1st (Australian) Battalion
2nd (British) Battalion
3rd (Australian) Battalion
4th (Australian and New Zealand) Battalion
Hong Kong and Singapore Mountain Battery

5th Mounted Yeomanry Brigade

Honourable Artillery Company (18–pounder) Battery

No. 7 Light Car Patrol (six Ford cars equipped with machine guns)
No. 1 Squadron Australian Flying Corps
No. 14 Squadron Royal Flying Corps

== Order of Battle March 1917 ==
Desert Column (Lieutenant General P. Chetwode)

53rd (Welsh) Division (Major General A.G. Dallas)

158th (North Wales) Brigade (Brigadier General H. A. Vernon)

1/5th (Flintshire) Battalion, Royal Welch Fusiliers
1/6th (Carnarvonshire & Anglesey) Battalion, Royal Welch Fusiliers
1/7th (Montgomery) Battalion, Royal Welch Fusiliers
1/1st Battalion, Herefordshire Regiment
158th Brigade Machine Gun Company

159th (Cheshire) Brigade (Brigadier General N. Money)

1/4th Battalion, Cheshire Regiment
1/7th Battalion, Cheshire Regiment
1/4th Battalion, Welch Regiment
1/5th Battalion Welch Regiment
159th Brigade Machine Gun Company

160th (Welsh Border) Brigade (Brigadier General V. L. N. Pearson)

2/4th Battalion, Queen's Royal Regiment (West Surrey)
1/4th Battalion, Royal Sussex Regiment
2/4th Battalion, Royal West Kent Regiment
2/10th Battalion, Middlesex Regiment
160th Brigade Machine Gun Company

Anzac Mounted Division (Major General H. G. Chauvel)

2nd Australian Light Horse Brigade (Brigadier General G. de L. Ryrie)

5th, 6th, 7th Australian Light Horse Regiments

New Zealand Mounted Rifle Brigade (Brigadier General E. W. C. Chaytor)

Auckland, Canterbury and Wellington Mounted Rifle Regiments

22nd Mounted Brigade (Brigadier General F. A. B. Fryer)

Stafford, 1/1st Lincolnshire Yeomanry, Sherwood Rangers Yeomanry/East Riding Yeomanry

Imperial Mounted Division (Major General H.W. Hodgson)

3rd Australian Light Horse Brigade (Brigadier General L. C. Wilson)

8th, 9th, 10th Australian Light Horse Regiments

5th Mounted Brigade (Brigadier General Percy Desmond FitzGerald)
6th Mounted Brigade (Brigadier General C A C. Godwin)

Queen's Own Dorset Yeomanry, Buckinghamshire Yeomanry and Berkshire Yeomanry

Artillery

Anzac Mounted Division 4 Batteries RHA of 4 18–pdrs = 16 guns
Imperial Mounted Division 4 Batteries RHA of 4 18–pdrs = 16 guns
Imperial Camel Brigade 1 Camel Pack Battery of 6 2.75-inch = 6 guns
53rd (Welsh) Division (3 Brigades RFA 12 18–pdrs=24 guns) 4 of each battery only = 16 guns; 4 4.5-inch howitzers = 8 howitzer
54th (East Anglian) Division (3 Brigades RFA 12 18–pdrs=24 guns) 4 of each battery only = 16 guns; 4 4.5-inch howitzers = 8 howitzer
Army Troops (3 Batteries of 4 60–pdrs=12 guns) one section only = 6 guns (Note: The third brigades of 53rd and 54th Divisions were in the Suez Canal Defences with 1st Light Horse Brigade about Bir el Abd, Mazar and Bardawil patrolling the pipeline until moving to El Arish on 20 March. And only four guns of each 18–pounder battery of the 53rd and 54th Divisions, and one section of each heavy battery were brought across the Sinai Peninsula. The guns left behind formed part of the Suez Canal Defences. [Wavell 1968, p. 94, 1st Light Horse Brigade War Diary March 1917 AWM4-10-1-32])

== Order of Battle April 1917 ==
General Headquarters Commander in Chief Lieutenant General (temp. General) A. J. Murray Eastern Force GOC Major General (temp. Lieutenant General C. M. Dobell Brigadier General General Staff Brevet Lieutenant Colonel (temp. Brigadier General G. P. Dawnay

Desert Column GOC Major General (temp. Lieutenant General P. W. Chetwode

Anzac Mounted Division GOC Colonel (temp. Major General) H. G. Chauvel

1st Australian Light Horse Brigade [Anzac Mounted Division] GOC Lieutenant Colonel C. F. Cox

1st Light Horse Regiment
2nd Light Horse Regiment
3rd Light Horse Regiment
1st Australian Light Horse Signal Troop
1st Australian Machine Gun Squadron

2nd Australian Light Horse Brigade GOC Colonel (temp. Brigadier General G. de L. Ryrie

5th Light Horse Regiment
6th Light Horse Regiment
7th Light Horse Regiment
2nd Australian Light Horse Signal Troop
2nd Australian Machine Gun Squadron

New Zealand Mounted Rifles Brigade GOC Brigadier General E. W. C. Chaytor)

Auckland Mounted Rifle Regiment
Canterbury Mounted Rifle Regiment
Wellington Mounted Rifle Regiment
New Zealand Mounted Rifles Signal Troop
New Zealand Machine Gun Squadron

22nd Mounted Brigade GOC Colonel (temp. Brigadier General) F. A. B. Fryer

1/1st Lincolnshire Yeomanry
1/1st Staffordshire Yeomanry
1/1st East Riding Yeomanry
22nd Mounted Brigade Signal Troop
18th Machine Gun Squadron

Divisional Troops same as April 1916 oob except

batteries not brigaded
Mounted Divisional Ammunition Column added
Nos 26 and 27 Australian Units of Supply substituted for Light Horse Supply Column
1/1st North Midland Mounted Brigade Field Ambulance substituted for 3rd Light Horse Field Ambulance

Imperial Mounted Division GOC Colonel (temp. Major General) H. W. Hodgson

3rd Light Horse Brigade GOC Colonel (temp. Brigadier General) J. R. Royston

8th Light Horse Regiment
9th Light Horse Regiment
10th Light Horse Regiment
3rd Australian Light Horse Signal Troop
3rd Australian Machine Gun Squadron

4th Light Horse Brigade GOC Lieutenant Colonel (temp. Brigadier General J. B. Meredith

4th Light Horse Regiment
11th Light Horse Regiment
12th Light Horse Regiment
4th Australian Light Horse Signal Troop
4th Australian Machine Gun Squadron

5th Mounted Brigade GOC Colonel (temp. Brigadier General) E. A. Wiggin

1/1st Warwick Yeomanry
1/1st Gloucester Yeomanry
1/1st Worcester Yeomanry
5th Mounted Signal Brigade Troop
16th Machine Gun Squadron

6th Mounted Brigade GOC Lieutenant Colonel (temp. Brigadier General) T. M. S. Pitt

1/1st Buckinghamshire Yeomanry
1/1st Berkshire Yeomanry
1/1st Dorsetshire Yeomanry
6th Brigade Signal Troop
17th Machine Gun Squadron

Divisional Troops

Artillery

1/1st Nottinghamshire and 1/1st Berkshire Batteries RHA
"A" and "B" Batteries, H.A.C.
Mounted Divisional Ammunition Column

Engineers

Imperial Mounted Division Field Squadron

Signal Service

Imperial Mounted Division Signal Squadron

ASC (unidentified)
Medical Units

3rd and 4th Light Horse, 1/1st and 1/2nd South Midland Mounted Brigades Field Ambulances.

== Notes ==
Notes

Citations
