= Edward John Howells =

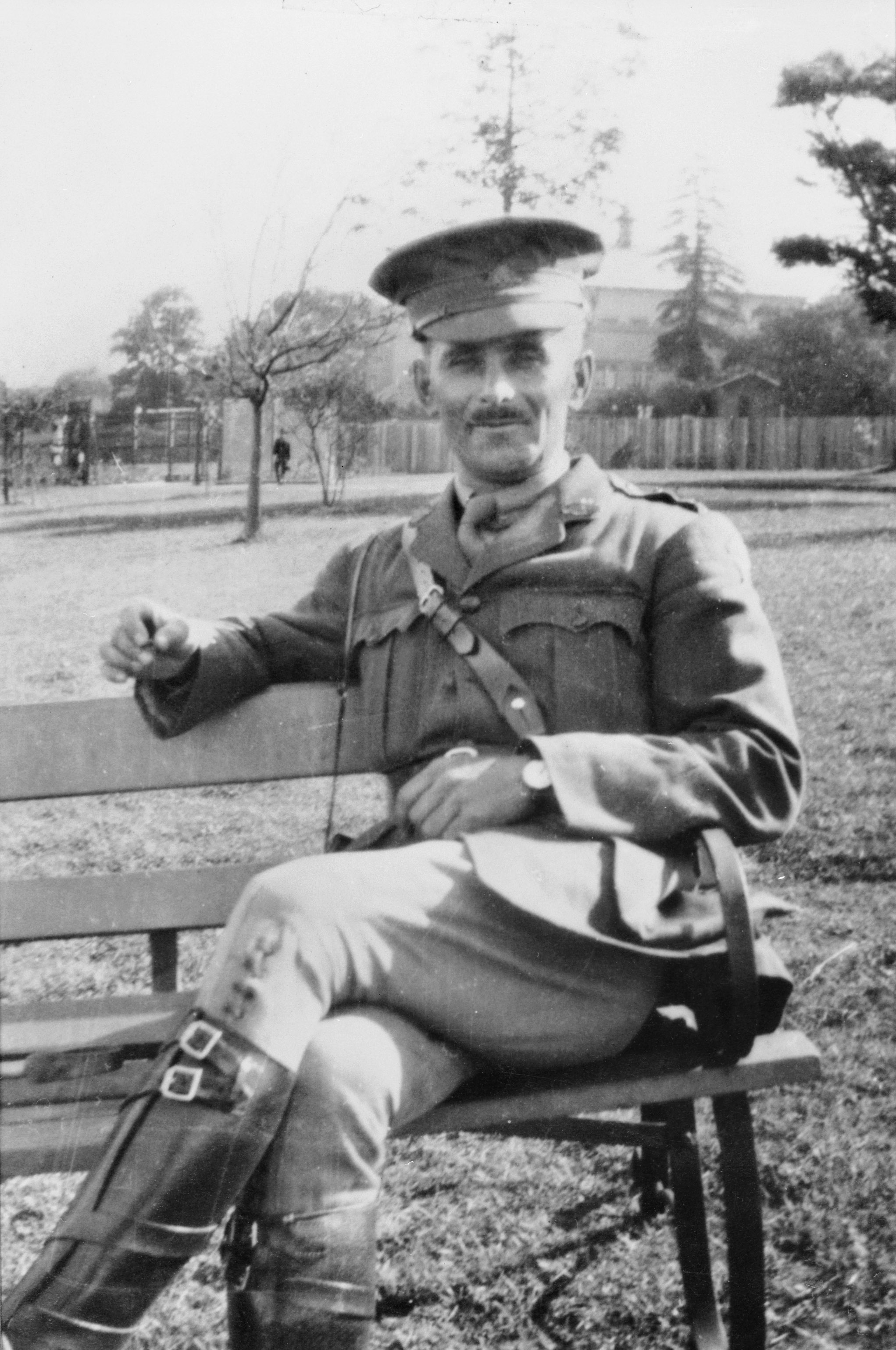
Howells, c. 1914

Edward John (EJ) Howells M.C. (1882–1959) was an Australian army officer (ANZAC) during World War I. He served in the RAAF between the wars, reaching the rank of Wing Commander.

He served at the Gallipoli campaign and in the Sinai Campaign with the Desert Mounted Corps. Howells is notable for forcing the first bridge over the River Jordan during WWI, an accomplishment that earned him the Military Cross.

== Early life ==
Edward John Howells, known as EJ, was born on 20 May 1882 in Barrow-in-Furness, England. As a child, he immigrated with his father, John Howells, and mother, Anna Roderick Howells, to Australia in May 1887. They settled in Camberwell, Victoria, a suburb of Melbourne. He was their only child. Young Howells demonstrated a talent for mechanics, worked at the Vulcan Foundry and later with Humble & Nicholson of Geelong. His technical abilities led to his acceptance into the prestigious Gordon School where he excelled in engineering and drafting. Upon graduation, he became an instructor at the school before employment as the Commonwealth’s Deputy Examiner of Patents in Melbourne in July 1910. His expertise in mechanics and engineering laid the foundation for his future contributions to the military.

== Military service ==
(Howells military records)

World War I – Gallipoli Campaign

At the outbreak of World War I, Howells, a former member of the Victoria Cadets, volunteered for the Australian Imperial Force and initially assigned to the 23rd Battalion (Australia) as a 33 year old 2nd Lieutenant. He sailed aboard the TSS Euripides in May 1915 for Egypt. While stationed in Heliopolis, he was transferred to the Engineer Corps, and soon after landed at ANZAC Cove, Gallipoli, on September 13, 1915 aboard the TSS Knights Templar.

At Gallipoli, Howells served with the 5th Field Company, Australian Engineers, commanded by Major Vernon Sturdee, primarily involved in tunnel digging and the laying of explosives under Turkish trenches. On 29 September 1915, Howells was overcome by gas during a mine explosion but was saved by Corporal John Henry Precious. Howells was evacuated to Lamos island, then to Malta to be treated for "neurasthenia", then to England for recovery. During convalescence in England, he missed the birth of his daughter and the death of his father.

=== World War I, Sinai and Palestine Campaign ===
After a brief recuperation in Australia, Howells returned to duty in Egypt, formed a bridging company and joined the Desert Mounted Corps under General Sir Edmund Allenby. As a Captain of Engineers, he was responsible for critical logistical tasks, including repairing wells for the largely horse-mounted army and constructing makeshift bridges for the advancing Allied units to capture Jerusalem, Beersheba, Jericho and Damascus.

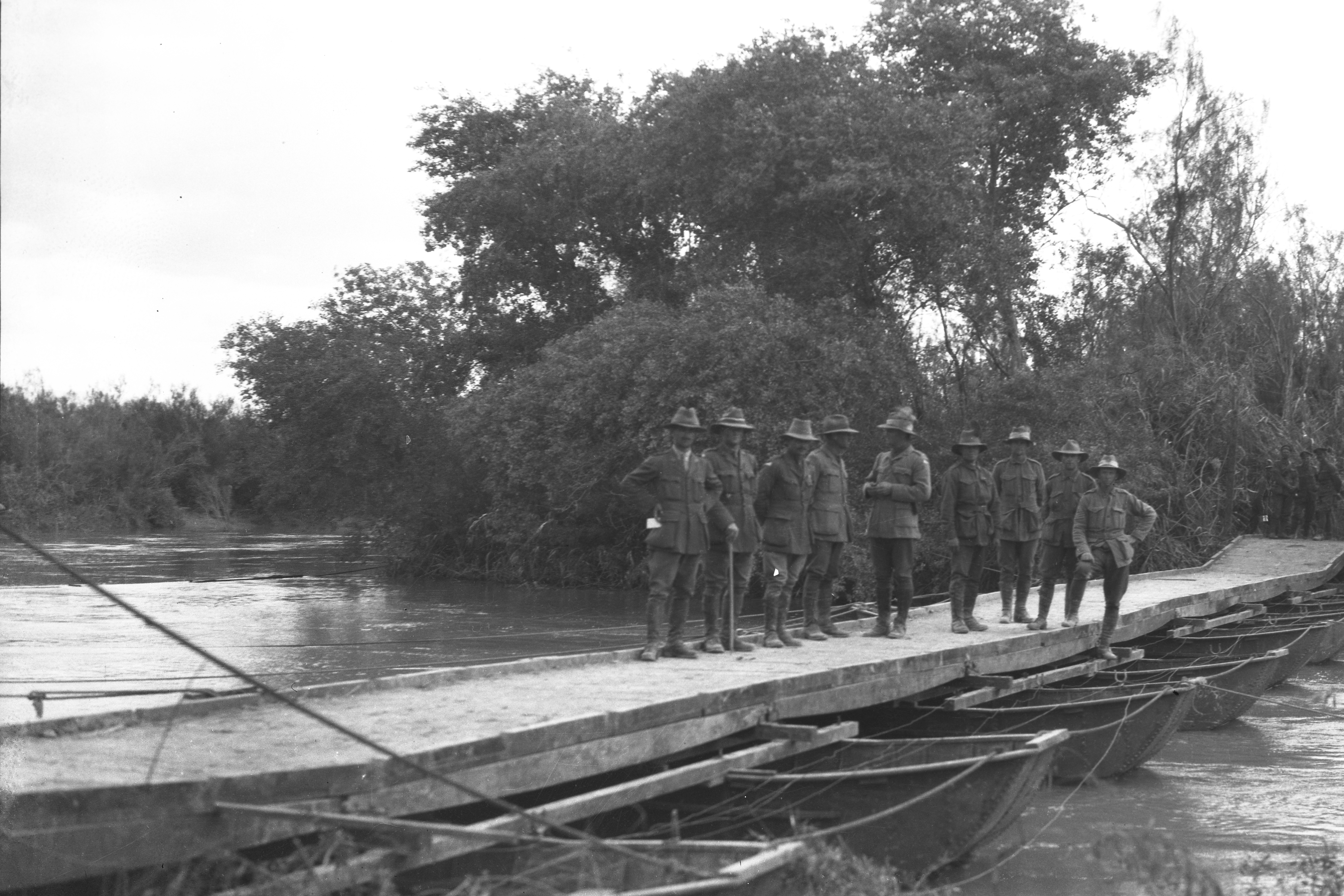
"The first ANZAC bridge constructed across the Jordan River. This bridge was erected under heavy fire by the bridging train of the Australian Engineers with the Desert Mounted Corps. It was the first to be built across the Jordan, which was running at about five miles an hour. The scrub was very thick on either side, making the approaches difficult; but the whole work was completed in an hour and three-quarters. Those on the bridge are (reading left to right): — Capt. E. J. Howells, Major Dick, – C. Riley, Lieut. Campbell, Lieut. Kidman, Sapper Dawson, M.M., Lce.Corp. M'Guigan, Corp. Strang, Lieut. E. S. Claydon. The photograph was taken by General Chetwode".

One of Howells' most significant accomplishments came during the campaign to cross the River Jordan. Allied forces wanted to sever the Turkish railway lines east of the Jordan River and link up with the Arab Army, advised by T.E. Lawrence. While larger British bridging units failed due to swift water and Turkish fire, Howells’ unit, D Field Troop, Australian Engineers, with labor from 3rd Light Horse Regiment and 23rd Battalion Londoners successfully bridged the flooded river under heavy Turkish fire, on the night of 21–22 March 1918. This allowed mounted troops to cross and secure the east bank so more bridges could be constructed. For his heroism, Howells was awarded the Military Cross. Several of his men were also recognized for their bravery, including Sapper S. Dawson MM, the first to swim across the river to secure ropes to the eastern bank, "Lance-Corporal F. Bell: of the engineers, repeatedly swam down stream under heavy fire, bearing the cables which were to hold the bridge in position", and Batman H.R.Y. McGuigan DCM, who accompanied Howells on nightly reconnaissance to the river to locate a site to attempt the crossing.

Howells and his unit repaired and constructed bridges throughout the campaign, including innovative “barrel bridges” for which he was mentioned in Dispatches to King George. Late in the campaign, he like many others was hospitalized with malaria and dysentery. After the Turkish surrender in October 1918, Howells was selected as Officer Commanding War Records Section, tasked with collecting war diaries and historical trophies, much of which became the initial collection of the Australian War Memorial Museum. A pontoon from his bridge was located and returned to Australia in 1953 and is on permanent display in the War Memorial in Canberra.

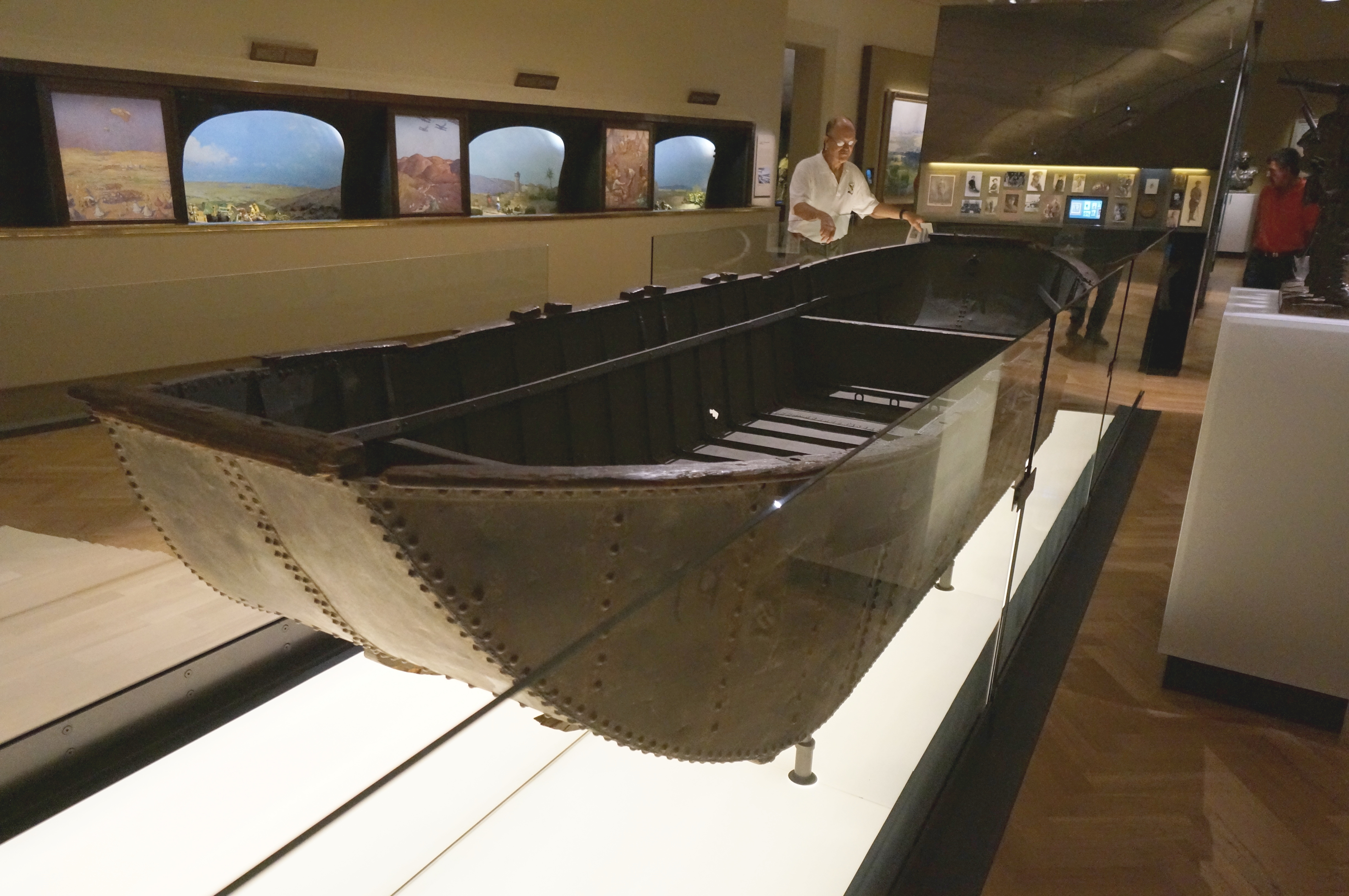

== Post-war life ==
Upon returning to Australia in 1919, Howells resumed his position at the Patent Office and enrolled in University of Melbourne to study law. His marriage had become strained, partly due to his absence during the war, and correspondence with a German woman named Lydia Imberger, whom he had met and socialized with at the German Colony, Jerusalem during the war. She corresponded with him in German until his death.

In 1921, Howells sought to return to military service and was appointed to the Royal Australian Air Force (RAAF). His duties involved traveling across Australia to test and recruit candidates for technical positions in the fledgling Air Force. Promoted to Wing Commander, Howells returned to Melbourne, but his ongoing mental health struggles led to him seek medical retirement in 1938.

== Personal life ==
Howells married Beatrice Anne Marks on 26 October 1905 in Melbourne. The couple had three daughters. One, Dorothy Elaine Howells, wrote a daily journal traveling from Australia through Europe in 1939 to join her father, reaching London before war was declared. She dropped Dorothy and used the byline Elaine Howells while reporting from London during the war for Sir Keith Murdoch’s Melbourne Herald, and other Australian papers. While reporting from London, she met and later married an American Eagle Squadron pilot, Hubert L. Stewart. They later settled in California.

Following his retirement in 1938, Howells quickly left for England and lived in Cambridge in 1938–39. He joined his daughter Elaine and wife Beatrice in Lostwithiel, Cornwall, after the war broke out. His fluency in German and his travels to Denmark just before Germany invaded Poland led to speculation of his involvement in British intelligence operations, though no unclassified records confirm this. Other officers operating at borders with Germany were kidnapped by the Nazis at the same time.

Howells' later years were marked by continued estrangement from his wife. He traveled to Paris, then alone to America twice and visited his daughter’s family in California. He ended up in an old soldiers' home in Heidelberg, outside Melbourne, where he died on 2 June 1959, age 77. His body was unclaimed, cremated, and his ashes scattered in the home’s rose garden.

== Recognition ==
Edward John Howells MC is remembered for his 28 1/2 years of military service and contributions to the engineering efforts of the Australian forces in World War I. His achievements, particularly his role in the first bridging of the River Jordan, remain a significant part of Australia's military history.
