= Nalin Bhatt =

Indian politician

Nalin Bhatt was an Indian politician who served as leader of the Bharatiya Janata Party in Gujarat. He was a member of the Gujarat Legislative Assembly and served as minister in Keshubhai Patel ministry.
