= Nalin Vimukthi =

Sri Lankan cricketer (born 1988)

Nalin Vimukthi (born Jayamaha Mudalige Don Nalin Vimukthi Jayamaha on 28 February 1988) is a Sri Lankan cricketer. He is a left-handed batsman and wicket-keeper who plays for Ragama Cricket Club. He was born in Kattiyawa-Talawa.

Vimukthi made his List A debut for the side during the 2009-10 Premier Limited Overs Tournament, against Badureliya Sports Club. He did not bat in the match, but took a single catch from behind the stumps, that of former One-Day International player Hemantha Wickramaratne.
