= Egyptian Expeditionary Force =

- Active: 1916–1919
- Country: British Empire; French Republic; Kingdom of Italy
- Engagements: First World War; Senussi campaign; Sinai and Palestine campaign

Commanders
- Notable commanders: Archibald Murray (1916–1917); Edmund Allenby (1917–1919)

The Egyptian Expeditionary Force (EEF) was a military formation of the British Empire, formed on 10 March 1916 under the command of General Archibald Murray from the Mediterranean Expeditionary Force and the Force in Egypt (1914–1915), at the beginning of the Sinai and Palestine campaign of the First World War.

Officially, the EEF and its personnel were part of the British Empire. In practice, the reality was somewhat more complex. The force drew upon manpower and support from a vast array of local Arab irregulars. Alongside imperial troops served (unofficially) hundreds of thousands of Egyptian Arabs, mostly employed in labour and transport corps, but also serving as irregular soldiers. Moreover, the EEF also incorporated French and Italian detachments, international volunteer formations such as the Jewish Legion, and cooperated closely with Arab Revolt forces operating outside the formal British military structure.

== History ==
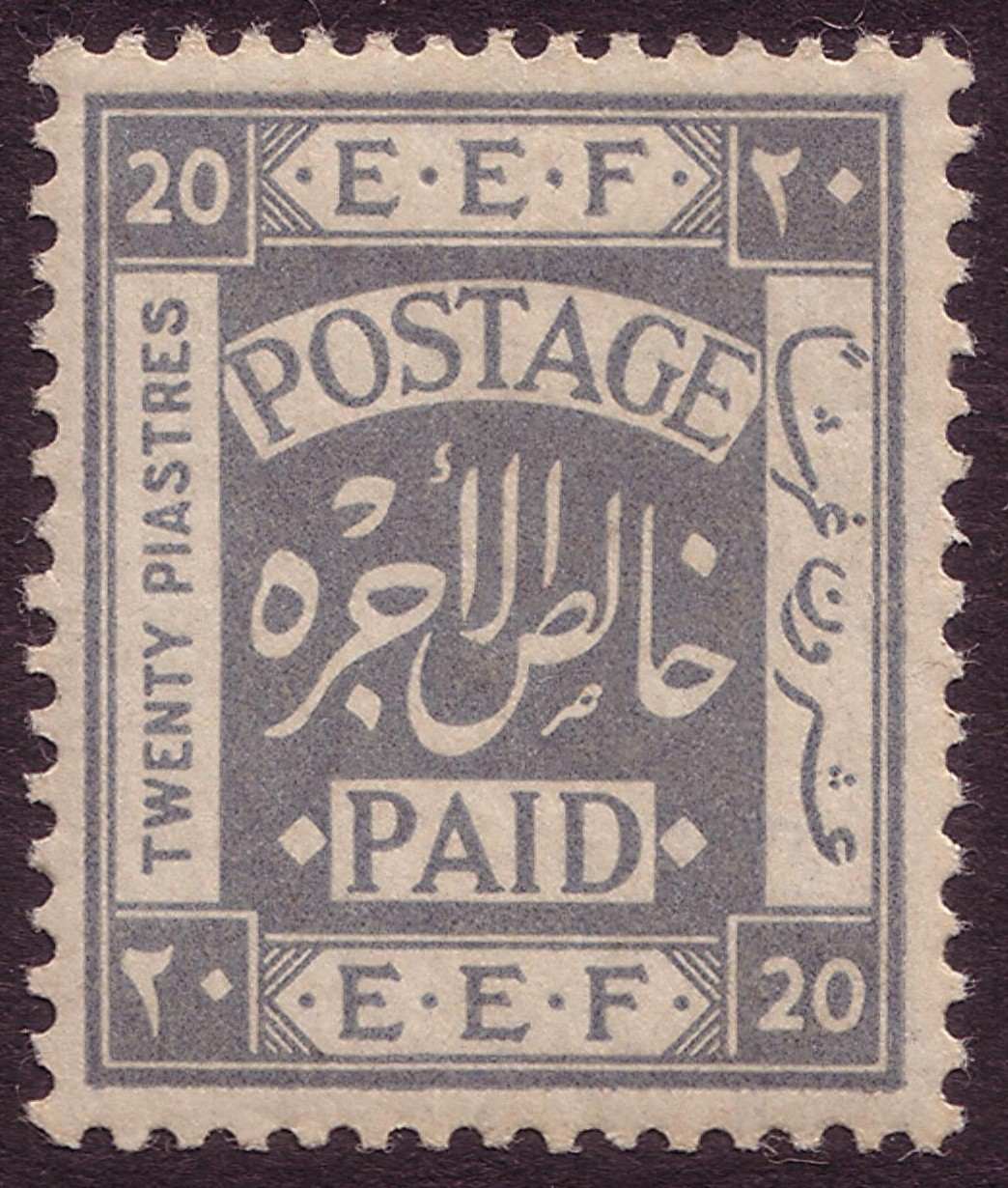
A mint stamp of the Egyptian Expeditionary Force available at EEF post offices in Lebanon.

Formed in the British protectorate of the Sultanate of Egypt, the initially small force was raised to guard the Suez Canal and Egypt. After the withdrawal from the Gallipoli campaign the force grew into a large reserve to provide reinforcements for the Western Front, while the Western Frontier Force fought in the Senussi campaign from 1915 to 1917 and the Eastern Force (EF) defended the canal at the Battle of Romani in August 1916. Following the victory at Romani, part of the Eastern Force pursued the Ottoman invading force back to Palestine after the victories at the Battle of Magdhaba in December 1916 and the Battle of Rafa in January 1917, by which time the Desert Column had been formed within the EF. These victories resulted in the recapture of substantial Egyptian territory and were followed in March and April by two Eastern Force defeats on Ottoman territory, at the First Battle of Gaza and Second Battle of Gaza in southern Palestine.

During the Stalemate in Southern Palestine from April to October 1917, Murray consolidated the EF's position and in June General Edmund Allenby took command and began preparations for an offensive. He reorganised the force into the XX Corps, XXI Corps and the Desert Mounted Corps (formerly the Desert Column). On 31 October two corps captured Beersheba defended by the Ottoman III Corps (that had fought at Gallipoli), which weakened their defences stretching almost continuously from Gaza to Beersheba. The Battle of Tel el Khuweilfe, the Third Battle of Gaza and the Battle of Hareira and Sheria forced an Ottoman withdrawal from Gaza on the night of 6/7 November and the beginning of the pursuit to Jerusalem. During the subsequent operations, about fifty mi (80 km) of Ottoman territory, was captured in the EEF victories at the Battle of Mughar Ridge (10–14 November) and the Battle of Jerusalem (17 November – 30 December).

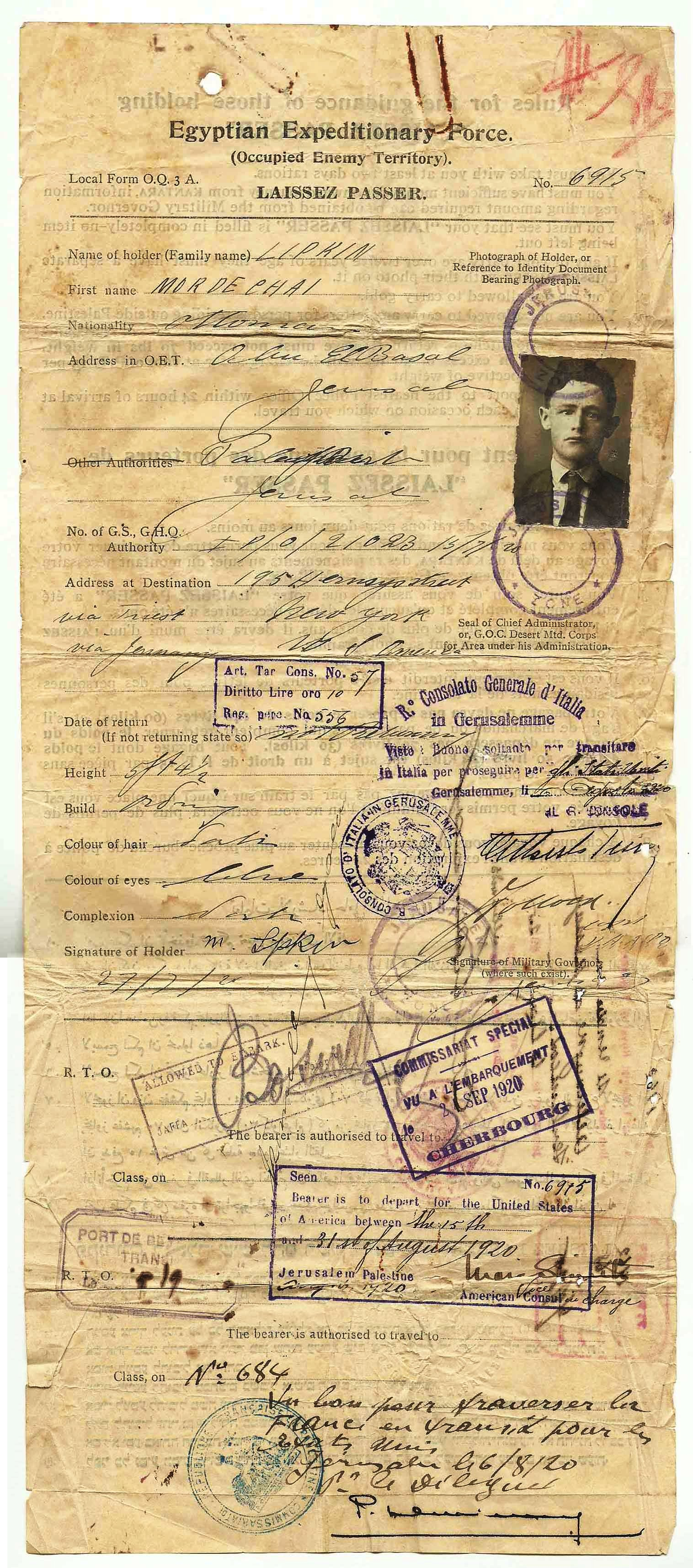
1920 EEF Laissez-passer issued at Jerusalem, British-occupied Palestine.

The British suffered many casualties on the Western Front in March 1918 during Operation Michael, the German spring offensive and the British transferred forces from the EEF to France. During this time, two failed attacks were made, the First Transjordan attack on Amman and the Second Transjordan attack on Shunet Nimrin and Es Salt to capture Es Salt, in March and April 1918, before Allenby's force resumed the offensive, again employing manoeuvre warfare at the Battle of Megiddo. The infantry attacks of the Battle of Tulkarm and the Battle of Tabsor created gaps in the Ottoman defences, enabling the Desert Mounted Corps to encircle the Ottoman infantry fighting in the Judean Hills during the Battle of Nazareth, the Capture of Afulah and Beisan, the Capture of Jenin, the Battle of Samakh and the capture of Tiberias. The EEF destroyed three Ottoman armies during the Battle of Sharon, the Battle of Nablus and the Third Transjordan attack, taking thousands of prisoners and large quantities of equipment. The EEF pursued the German and Ottoman remnants to Damascus and Aleppo, before the Ottoman Empire signed the Armistice of Mudros on 30 October 1918, ending the Sinai and Palestine Campaign. The British Mandate of Palestine, and the Mandate for Syria and the Lebanon were created to administer the captured territories.

== See also ==
- Sinai and Palestine campaign
- History of Palestine
- Postage stamps and postal history of Palestine

== Bibliography ==
- Bruce, Anthony (2002). The Last Crusade: The Palestine Campaign in the First World War. London: John Murray. ISBN 978-0-7195-5432-2.
- Falls, Cyril; Becke, A. F. (maps) (1930). Military Operations Egypt & Palestine from June 1917 to the End of the War (Part I). Official History of the Great War Based on Official Documents by Direction of the Historical Section of the Committee of Imperial Defence. Vol. II. London: HMSO. OCLC 644354483.
- Falls, Cyril; Becke, A. F. (maps) (1930a). Military Operations Egypt & Palestine from June 1917 to the End of the War (Part II). Official History of the Great War Based on Official Documents by Direction of the Historical Section of the Committee of Imperial Defence. Vol. II. London: HMSO. OCLC 256950972.
- Keogh, E. G.; Graham, J. (1955). Suez to Aleppo. Melbourne: Directorate of Military Training by Wilkie. OCLC 220029983.
- Sheppard, Eric William, ed. (1968) [1933]. A Short History of the British Army (4th ed.). London: Constable. OCLC 35621223.
  - Wavell, A. "The Palestine Campaigns". In Sheppard (1968).
