= Deiran =

Archaeological site in modern Rehovot, Israel

Deiran (Arabic: ديران) is an archaeological site in modern-day Rehovot, Israel.

== Name and identification ==
Jewish-studies scholar Klein identified Khirbet Deiran as Kerem Doron ("vineyard of Doron"), a place mentioned in Talmud Yerushalmi (Peah 7:4), but Moshe Fischer contested this claim, believing that there is "no special reason" for this identification. Richard Kalmin is unsure whether Doron was a place or a person.

== History ==
Khirbat Deiran was inhabited during the Hellenistic, Roman, and Byzantine periods, with a major expansion to about 6 hectares during the early centuries of Islamic rule. Israeli archaeologist Buchenino reported possible evidence of Jewish or Samaritan occupation on site during the Roman and Byzantine periods.

According to Israeli Ottomanist Yuval Ben-Bassat, during the Ottoman period the area was inhabited by the Sawtariyya Bedouins, who dwelled in tents with their flocks.

== Jewish settlement ==
Rehovot was founded as a moshava on Deiran's lands in 1890 by Polish Jewish immigrants who had come with the First Aliyah, seeking to establish a township which would not be under the influence of the Baron Edmond James de Rothschild, on land which was purchased from a Christian Arab by the Menuha Venahala society, an organization in Warsaw that raised funds for Jewish settlement in Eretz Israel.

The once Arab populated estate, now lied in the center of the built-up area of the Rehovot. According to Marom, Deiran offered "a convenient launching pad for early land purchase initiatives which shaped the pattern of Jewish settlement until the beginning of the British Mandate".

In March 1892, a dispute over pasture rights erupted between the residents of Rehovot and the neighboring village of Zarnuqa, which took two years to resolve. Another dispute broke out with the Sawtariyya Bedouins, which had been cultivating some of the land as tenant farmers. According to Moshe Smilansky, one of the early settlers of Rehovot, the Bedouins had received compensation for the land, but refused to vacate it. In 1893, they attacked the moshava. Through the intervention of a respected Arab sheikh, a compromise was reached, with the Sawtariyya receiving compensation which they used to dig a well.
