= 1st South Western Mounted Brigade =

- Active: 1908–1915
- Country: United Kingdom
- Branch: British Army
- Type: Yeomanry
- Size: Brigade
- peacetime HQ: Salisbury
- Engagements: World War I

Commanders
- Notable commanders: Anthony Ashley-Cooper, 9th Earl of Shaftesbury

The 1st South Western Mounted Brigade was a formation of the Territorial Force of the British Army, organised in 1908. By 1915 its regiments had been posted away so it was broken up; it never saw active service as a brigade. The Headquarters may have formed the HQ for 2/1st Southern Mounted Brigade.

== Formation ==
Under the terms of the Territorial and Reserve Forces Act 1907 (7 Edw.7, c.9), the brigade was formed in 1908 as part of the Territorial Force. It consisted of three yeomanry regiments, a horse artillery battery and ammunition column, a transport and supply column and a field ambulance. The Queen's Own Dorset Yeomanry was attached for training in peacetime.

As the name suggests, the units were drawn from South West England, predominantly Wiltshire, Somerset, Hampshire and Dorset.

== World War I ==
The brigade was mobilised on 4 August 1914 at the outbreak of the First World War. Initially assigned to the Portsmouth Defences in August 1914, the brigade moved to the Forest Row area of Sussex in October 1914. Thereafter, the regiments left the brigade for other formations.

- The Queen's Own Dorset Yeomanry left in September 1914 for the 2nd South Midland Mounted Brigade. It ended the war in the 4th Cavalry Division in Palestine.
- The North Somerset Yeomanry left the brigade in November 1914, joining the 6th Cavalry Brigade in France on 13 November 1914. It remained with the 6th Cavalry Brigade until April 1918 when it was broken up, sending a squadron to reinforce each of the other regiments in the brigade.
- The Royal Wiltshire Yeomanry (Prince of Wales's Own Royal Regiment) was split up as divisional cavalry in 1915:

Regimental HQ and D Squadron joined 38th (Welsh) Division at Winchester
A Squadron joined 40th Division at Aldershot
B Squadron joined 41st Division at Aldershot about November 1915.
It was later brought back together as a corps cavalry regiment. It was converted to infantry and absorbed into 6th (Wiltshire Yeomanry) Battalion, Wiltshire Regiment in September 1917.

- The Hampshire Yeomanry (Carabiniers) was split up as divisional cavalry in March 1916:

Regimental HQ and B Squadron joined 60th (2/2nd London) Division at Warminster on 26 April 1916
A Squadron joined 58th (2/1st London) Division at Ipswich on 21 March 1916
C Squadron joined 61st (2nd South Midland) Division at Ludgershall on 18 March 1916.
It was later brought back together as a corps cavalry regiment. In September 1917 it was converted to infantry and absorbed into the 15th (Hampshire Yeomanry) Battalion, Hampshire Regiment.

- Hampshire Royal Horse Artillery joined the Essex and West Riding RHA in V Lowland Brigade, Royal Field Artillery (T.F.); it was re-equipped with four 18 pounders before departing for Egypt in February 1916 where it joined 52nd (Lowland) Division. It was reformed as horse artillery on 5 July 1917 exchanging its 18 pounders for 13 pounders and joined the Yeomanry Mounted Division. It remained with the division when it was restructured and indianized (Note: British divisions were converted to the British Indian Army standard whereby brigades only retained one British regiment or battalion and most support units were Indian (artillery excepted).) as the 1st Mounted Division (from 24 April 1918) and later renamed as 4th Cavalry Division (23 July 1918). It served throughout the Sinai and Palestine Campaign from 1916 to 1918.

By 1915, with its regiments having been posted away, the brigade was dissolved. The headquarters staff may have been used to form the 2/1st Southern Mounted Brigade.

== See also ==
- 2/1st South Western Mounted Brigade for the 2nd Line formation
- British yeomanry during the First World War

== Bibliography ==
- Becke, Major A.F. (1936). Order of Battle of Divisions Part 2A. The Territorial Force Mounted Divisions and the 1st-Line Territorial Force Divisions (42–56). London: His Majesty's Stationery Office. OCLC 863387009.
- James, Brigadier E.A. (1978). British Regiments 1914–18. London: Samson Books Limited. ISBN 0-906304-03-2.
- Perry, F.W. (1993). Order of Battle of Divisions Part 5B. Indian Army Divisions. Newport: Ray Westlake Military Books. ISBN 1-871167-23-X.
- Rinaldi, Richard A (2008). Order of Battle of the British Army 1914. Ravi Rikhye. ISBN 978-0-97760728-0.
- Sumner, Ian (2001). The Indian Army 1914-1947. Osprey Elite. Vol. 75. Osprey Publishing. ISBN 978-1-84176-196-1.
- Westlake, Ray (1992). British Territorial Units 1914-18. Osprey Publishing. ISBN 978-1-85532-168-7.
