= Hampshire Royal Horse Artillery =

Former British Army horse artillery battery

Hampshire Royal Horse Artillery (T.F.) 1/1st Hampshire RHA (T.F.)
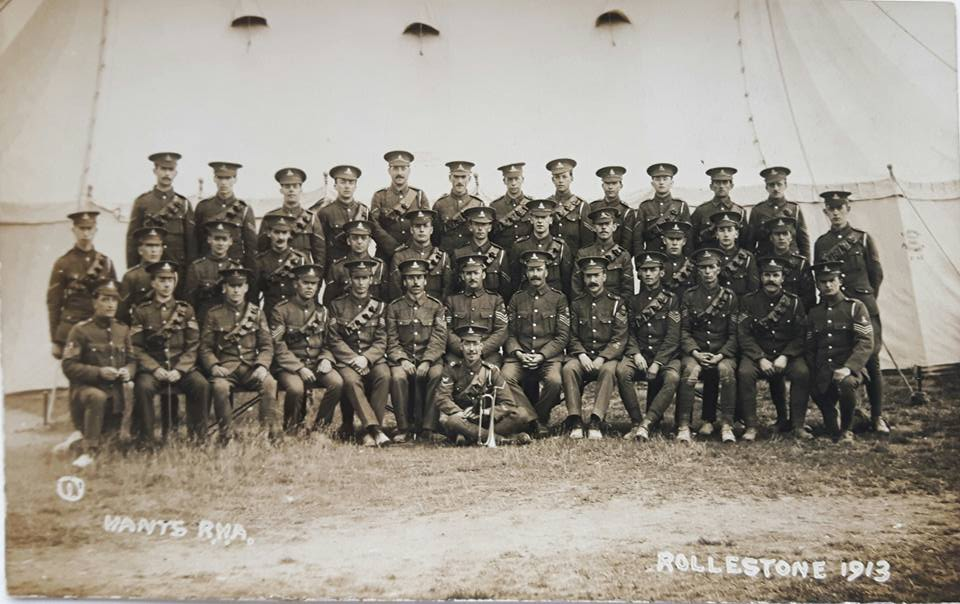
- Group of the Hampshire Royal Horse Artillery, at Rolleston Camp, 1913
- Active: 10 September 1909 – 1 June 1920
- Country: United Kingdom
- Branch: British Army
- Type: Artillery
- Size: Battery
- Part of: 1st South Western Mounted Brigade; V Lowland Brigade, RFA (T.F.); XX Brigade, RHA (T.F.)
- peacetime HQ: Southampton
- Equipment: Ordnance QF 15-pounder Ordnance QF 18-pounder Ordnance QF 13-pounder
- Engagements: First World War Sinai and Palestine 1916-18 Battle of Romani First, Second, Third Battles of Gaza Capture of Jerusalem Battle of Megiddo Capture of Damascus

The Hampshire Royal Horse Artillery was a Territorial Force Royal Horse Artillery battery that was formed in Hampshire in 1909. It saw active service during the First World War in Egypt and Palestine from 1916 to 1918, initially as field artillery with 52nd (Lowland) Division before being converted back to horse artillery and serving with the Yeomanry Mounted Division and 1st Mounted / 4th Cavalry Division. A second line battery, 2/1st Hampshire RHA, served on the Western Front in 1917 and 1918 as part of an Army Field Artillery Brigade. Post-war, it was reconstituted as a Royal Field Artillery battery.

== History ==
=== Formation ===
The Territorial Force (TF) was formed on 1 April 1908 following the enactment of the Territorial and Reserve Forces Act 1907 (7 Edw.7, c.9) which combined and re-organised the old Volunteer Force, the Honourable Artillery Company and the Yeomanry. On formation, the TF contained 14 infantry divisions and 14 mounted yeomanry brigades. Each yeomanry brigade included a horse artillery battery and an ammunition column.

On 18 March 1908, Wiltshire Royal Horse Artillery (Territorial Force) was proposed to be raised as a new unit. However, poor recruiting led to a change in plans and the Hampshire Royal Horse Artillery (Territorial Force) was raised instead. It was the last Territorial Force Royal Horse Artillery unit to be raised and it was recognized by the Army Council on 10 September 1909. The unit consisted of

Battery HQ at St Mary's Road in Southampton
Hampshire Battery at Southampton
1st South Western Mounted Brigade Ammunition Column at Basingstoke

The unit was equipped with four Ehrhardt 15-pounder guns and allocated as artillery support to the 1st South Western Mounted Brigade.

=== First World War ===
In accordance with the Territorial and Reserve Forces Act 1907 (7 Edw.7, c.9) which brought the Territorial Force into being, the TF was intended to be a home defence force for service during wartime and members could not be compelled to serve outside the country. However, on the outbreak of war on 4 August 1914, many members volunteered for Imperial Service. Therefore, TF units were split into 1st Line (liable for overseas service) and 2nd Line (home service for those unable or unwilling to serve overseas) units. 2nd Line units performed the home defence role, although in fact most of these were also posted abroad in due course.

==== 1/1st Hampshire ====
The 1st Line battery was embodied with the 1st South Western Mounted Brigade on 4 August 1914 at the outbreak of the First World War. Initially assigned to the Portsmouth Defences in August 1914, the brigade moved to the Forest Row area of Sussex in October 1914. The yeomanry regiments left the brigade for other formations in 1915 and it ceased to exist.

Field artillery

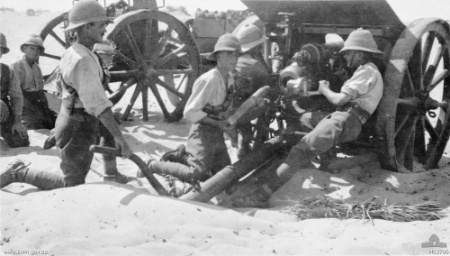
British artillerymen loading an 18 pounder gun at Romani in 1916

The battery, along with the Essex and West Riding RHA, joined V Lowland Brigade, Royal Field Artillery (T.F.) when it was formed on 13 January 1916 at Leicester. Before departing for the Middle East, the battery were re-equipped with four 18 pounders.

The brigade embarked between 15 and 18 February 1916 at Devonport and arrived at Port Said on 2 March. It joined 52nd (Lowland) Division at El Qantara on 17 March in the Suez Canal Defences. The brigade was renumbered as CCLXIII Brigade, RFA (T.F.) on 28 May and the battery as A/CCLXIII Battery on the same date. On 15 September, the brigade was renumbered as CCLXIV Brigade, RFA (T.F.) (the battery became A/CCLXIV Battery) and on 30 December back to CCLXIII Brigade, RFA (T.F.). The battery was, once again, designated as A/CCLXIII Battery.

On that date, C Battery (formerly West Riding RHA) was broken up and one section (Note: A Subsection consisted of a single gun and limber drawn by six horses (with three drivers), eight gunners (riding on the limber or mounted on their own horses), and an ammunition wagon also drawn by six horses (with three drivers). Two Subsections formed a Section and in a six gun battery these would be designated as Left, Centre and Right Sections.) joined the battery to make it up to six 18 pounders; the other section joined B Battery (former Essex RHA). The brigade now consisted of two batteries of six 18 pounders each.

While with 52nd (Lowland) Division, the division took part in the Battle of Romani (4 and 5 August 1916) and the First (26 and 27 March 1917) and Second (17 – 19 April 1917) Battles of Gaza.

Horse artillery

At the end of June 1917, arrangements were made to reform the brigade as a horse artillery brigade. On 5 July 1917, the brigade exchanged its 18 pounders for 13 pounders and was redesignated as XX Brigade, RHA (T.F.). Essex and Hampshire Batteries RHA were reformed with four 13 pounders each; West Riding Battery RHA was not reformed at this point. (Note: West Riding RHA was not reconstituted until 7 February 1920 when it formed 12th West Riding Battery in 3rd West Riding Brigade, RFA (later 71st (West Riding) Regiment, RA) and ceased to be a Royal Horse Artillery battery.)

The Hampshire Battery (with XX Brigade, RHA) joined the Yeomanry Mounted Division at Khan Yunis on 5 July. (Note: Essex Battery, RHA remained with 52nd (Lowland) Division until 17 September 1917 when it joined 7th Mounted Brigade. Berkshire, RHA and Leicestershire, RHA (four 13 pounders each) joined XX Brigade, RHA on 5 July 1917.) The brigade remained with the division when it was restructured and indianized (Note: British divisions were converted to the British Indian Army standard whereby brigades only retained one British regiment or battalion and most support units were Indian (artillery excepted).) as the 1st Mounted Division (from 24 April 1918) and later renamed as 4th Cavalry Division (23 July 1918).

During its time with the Yeomanry Mounted Division, the division served as part of the Egyptian Expeditionary Force in Palestine. From 31 October it took part in the Third Battle of Gaza, including the Battle of Beersheba (in GHQ Reserve) and the Capture of the Sheria Position under the Desert Mounted Corps (DMC). Still with the DMC, it took part in the Battle of Mughar Ridge on 13 and 14 November and the Battle of Nebi Samwil from 17 to 24 November. From 27 to 29 November, it withstood the Turkish counter-attacks during the Capture of Jerusalem.

Once the division was restructured and renamed, it served with the DMC for the rest of the war, taking part in the Second Transjordan Raid (30 April to 4 May 1918) and the Final Offensive, in particular the Battle of Megiddo (19 to 25 September) and the Capture of Damascus (1 October).

The 4th Cavalry Division remained in Palestine on occupation duties after the end of the war. However, demobilization began immediately and most of the British war time units had left by May 1919.

==== 2/1st Hampshire ====
2/1st Hampshire RHA (T.F.)
- Active: 1914 – 1919
- Country: United Kingdom
- Branch: British Army
- Type: Artillery
- Size: Battery
- Part of: 2/1st South Western Mounted Brigade; CCXCV Brigade, RFA (T.F.); CCXCVIII Brigade, RFA (T.F.)
- Equipment: Ordnance QF 15-pounder Ordnance QF 18-pounder
- Engagements: First World War Western Front 1917-18

Hampshire RHA formed a 2nd line in 1914, initially designated as the Hampshire (Reserve) Battery RHA and later given a fractional designation as 2/1st Hampshire Battery, RHA.

The pre-war Territorial Force infantry divisions were generally (Note: 51st (Highland) Division was exceptional in that it had three field and one mountain artillery brigade.) supported by four field artillery brigades. (Note: The basic organic unit of the Royal Artillery was, and is, the Battery. When grouped together they formed brigades, in the same way that infantry battalions or cavalry regiments were grouped together in brigades. At the outbreak of the First World War, a field artillery brigade of headquarters (4 officers, 37 other ranks), three batteries (5 and 193 each), and a brigade ammunition column (4 and 154) had a total strength just under 800 so was broadly comparable to an infantry battalion (just over 1,000) or a cavalry regiment (about 550). Like an infantry battalion, an artillery brigade was usually commanded by a Lieutenant-Colonel. Artillery brigades were redesignated as regiments in 1938. Note that the battery strength refers to a battery of six guns; a four-gun battery would be about two thirds of this.) These were numbered I, II, III and IV within each division and consisted of three gun brigades (each of three batteries, equipped with four 15-pounder guns) and a howitzer brigade (two batteries of four 5" howitzers). Artillery for 2nd Line divisions were formed in a similar manner, with a fractional designation, for example the 2/I North Midland Brigade, RFA (with 2/1st, 2/2nd and 2/3rd Lincolnshire Batteries, RFA) for 59th (2nd North Midland) Division. Territorial Force artillery brigades were later numbered in a consecutive sequence, and batteries lettered, so for the above example, CCXCV Brigade, RFA with A, B and C batteries.

The battery, equipped with four 18 pounders, joined CCXCV Brigade, RFA (T.F.) in 59th (2nd North Midland) Division in Ireland in early May 1916 and became D/CCXCV Battery. On 10 July 1916, the battery transferred to CCXCVIII Brigade, RFA (T.F.) (former 2/IV North Midland Brigade) as A/CCXCVIII Battery. At this point, CCXCVIII Brigade consisted of three 2nd Line RHA batteries: 2/1st Hampshire as A Battery, 2/1st Essex as B Battery and 2/1st Glamorganshire as C Battery.

In January 1917, the division returned to England. Before leaving Ireland, the battery was made up to six 18 pounders with one section of C/CCXCVIII Battery (former 2/1st Glamorganshire Battery, RHA). (Note: Elsewhere, Becke says that 2/1st Glamorganshire RHA was renamed as 815th Battery, RFA and remained in the United Kingdom throughout the war.)

On 17 February 1917, the division started moving overseas and by 3 March had completed its concentration at Méricourt in France. Shortly after arrival on the Western Front, on 4 April 1917, CCXCVIII Brigade left 59th (2nd North Midlnd) Division and became an Army Field Artillery Brigade. (Note: Army Field Artillery Brigades were artillery brigades that were excess to the needs of the divisions, withdrawn to form an artillery reserve.) At the Armistice, the battery (six 18 pounders) was still with CCXCVIII Army Brigade, RFA serving as Army Troops with the Fourth Army.

=== Post war ===
Hampshire RHA was not reconstituted until 1 June 1920 when it formed a battery (later numbered 378th) in 7th (Hampshire) Army Brigade, RFA and ceased to be a Royal Horse Artillery battery. The HQ and the other battery (later numbered 377th) were provided by the Hampshire Yeomanry and the brigade was later redesignated as 95th (Hampshire) Field Brigade, RA (in July 1937) and re-roled as 72nd (Hampshire) Anti-Aircraft Brigade, RA (in February 1938). 378th Battery maintained "Hampshire RHA" as a sub-title and continued to do so when converted to 218th Anti-Aircraft Battery.

== See also ==
- List of Territorial Force horse artillery batteries 1908

== Bibliography ==
- Becke, Archibald F. (1936). Order of Battle of Divisions Part 2A. The Territorial Force Mounted Divisions and the 1st-Line Territorial Force Divisions (42–56). London: HMSO. OCLC 4405016.
- Becke, Archibald F. (1937). Order of Battle of Divisions Part 2B. The 2nd-Line Territorial Force Divisions (57th–69th) with The Home-Service Divisions (71st–73rd) and 74th and 75th Divisions. London: HMSO. OCLC 4405016.
- Clarke, Dale (2004). British Artillery 1914–19 Field Army Artillery. Vol. 94 of New Vanguard Series. Oxford: Osprey Publishing. ISBN 1-84176-688-7.
- Clarke, W.G. (1993). Horse Gunners: The Royal Horse Artillery, 200 Years of Panache and Professionalism. Woolwich: The Royal Artillery Institution. ISBN 09520762-0-9.
- Farndale, General Sir Martin (1988). The Forgotten Fronts and the Home Base, 1914–18. History of the Royal Regiment of Artillery. Woolwich: The Royal Artillery Institution. ISBN 1-870114-05-1.
- Frederick, J.B.M. (1984). Lineage Book of British Land Forces 1660–1978. Wakefield, Yorkshire: Microform Academic Publishers. ISBN 1-85117-009-X.
- James, Brigadier E.A. (1978). British Regiments 1914–18. London: Samson Books Limited. ISBN 0-906304-03-2.
- Perry, F.W. (1993). Order of Battle of Divisions Part 5B. Indian Army Divisions. Newport: Ray Westlake Military Books. ISBN 1-871167-23-X.
- Rinaldi, Richard A (2008). Order of Battle of the British Army 1914. Ravi Rikhye. ISBN 978-0-97760728-0.
- Westlake, Ray (1992). British Territorial Units 1914–18. Osprey Publishing. ISBN 978-1-85532-168-7.
- Order of Battle of the British Armies in France, November 11th, 1918. France: General Staff, GHQ. 1918.
