= XX Brigade, Royal Horse Artillery (T.F.) =

Former horse artillery brigade of the British Army

V Lowland Brigade, RFA (T.F.) CCLXIII Brigade, RFA (T.F.) CCLXIV Brigade, RFA (T.F.) XX Brigade, RHA (T.F.)
- Active: 13 January 1916 – 2 November 1919
- Country: United Kingdom
- Branch: British Army
- Type: Artillery
- Size: Battalion
- Part of: 52nd (Lowland) Division; Yeomanry Mounted Division; 4th Cavalry Division
- Equipment: Ordnance QF 18-pounder Ordnance QF 13-pounder
- Engagements: World War I Sinai and Palestine 1916-18 Battle of Romani First, Second, Third Battles of Gaza Capture of Jerusalem Battle of Megiddo Capture of Damascus

V Lowland Brigade, Royal Field Artillery (Territorial Force) was a field artillery brigade formed from three Territorial Force Royal Horse Artillery batteries in January 1916. It was assigned to the 52nd (Lowland) Division to replace I Lowland Brigade, RFA (T.F.) and joined the division in Egypt.

The brigade was reformed as horse artillery in July 1917, redesignated as XX Brigade, Royal Horse Artillery (Territorial Force) and joined the Yeomanry Mounted Division (later 1st Mounted Division and 4th Cavalry Division).

The brigade saw active service in World War I in the Sinai and Palestine Campaign in 1917 and 1918. It remained in Palestine on occupation duties after the end of the war and was finally disbanded in November 1919.

== History ==
=== Formation ===
The pre-war Territorial Force infantry divisions were generally (Note: 51st (Highland) Division was exceptional in that it had three field and one mountain artillery brigade.) supported by four field artillery brigades. (Note: The basic organic unit of the Royal Artillery was, and is, the Battery. When grouped together they formed brigades, in the same way that infantry battalions or cavalry regiments were grouped together in brigades. At the outbreak of World War I, a field artillery brigade of headquarters (4 officers, 37 other ranks), three batteries (5 and 193 each), and a brigade ammunition column (4 and 154) had a total strength just under 800 so was broadly comparable to an infantry battalion (just over 1,000) or a cavalry regiment (about 550). Like an infantry battalion, an artillery brigade was usually commanded by a Lieutenant-Colonel. Artillery brigades were redesignated as regiments in 1938. Note that the battery strength refers to a battery of six guns; a four-gun battery would be about two thirds of this.) These were numbered I, II, III and IV within each division and consisted of three gun brigades (each of three batteries, equipped with four 15-pounder guns) and a howitzer brigade (two batteries of four 5" howitzers).

When the 52nd (Lowland) Division was ordered to Gallipoli in May 1915, it left two of its field artillery brigades behind in the UK on the Forth Defences. III Lowland Brigade, RFA (T.F.) (1st, 2nd and 3rd Glasgow Batteries and Brigade Ammunition Column) rejoined the division in Egypt in March 1916, but I Lowland Brigade, RFA (T.F.) (1st and 2nd Edinburgh and Midlothian Batteries and Brigade Ammunition Column) proceeded to France in October 1915 where it was re-equipped with 18 pounders and joined 51st (Highland) Division.

V Lowland Brigade, RFA (T.F.) was formed on 13 January 1916 at Leicester to replace I Lowland Brigade, RFA in 52nd Division. It consisted of the Essex, Hampshire and West Riding RHA Batteries and a Brigade Ammunition Column (BAC). Before departing for the Middle East, each of the batteries were re-equipped with four 18 pounders.

=== 52nd (Lowland) Division ===
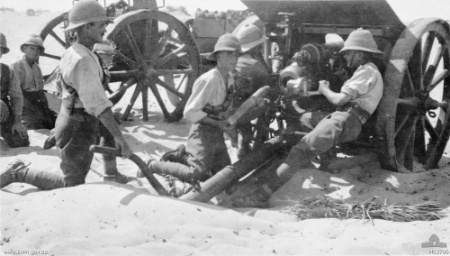
British artillerymen loading an 18 pounder gun at Romani in 1916

The brigade embarked between 15 and 18 February 1916 at Devonport and arrived at Port Said on 2 March. It joined 52nd (Lowland) Division at El Qantara on 17 March in the Suez Canal Defences. The brigade was renumbered as CCLXIII Brigade, RFA (T.F.) on 28 May and Hampshire RHA as A Battery, Essex RHA as B Battery, and West Riding RHA as C Battery on the same date. On 15 September, the brigade was renumbered as CCLXIV Brigade, RFA (T.F.) and on 30 December back to CCLXIII Brigade, RFA (T.F.).

Also on 30 December, C Battery (formerly West Riding RHA) was broken up: one section (Note: A Subsection consisted of a single gun and limber drawn by six horses (with three drivers), eight gunners (riding on the limber or mounted on their own horses), and an ammunition wagon also drawn by six horses (with three drivers). Two Subsections formed a Section and in a six gun battery these would be designated as Left, Centre and Right Sections.) went to A Battery (formerly Hampshire RHA) and the other section to B Battery (former Essex RHA). The brigade now consisted of two batteries of six 18 pounders each.

While with 52nd (Lowland) Division, the division took part in the Battle of Romani (4 and 5 August 1916) and the First (26 and 27 March 1917) and Second (17 – 19 April 1917) Battles of Gaza.

=== Conversion to horse artillery ===
At the end of June 1917, arrangements were made to reform the brigade as a horse artillery brigade. On 5 July 1917, the brigade exchanged its 18 pounders for 13 pounders and was redesignated as XX Brigade, RHA (T.F.). Essex and Hampshire Batteries RHA were reformed with four 13 pounders each; West Riding Battery RHA was not reformed at this point. (Note: West Riding RHA was not reconstituted until 7 February 1920 when it formed 12th West Riding Battery in 3rd West Riding Brigade, RFA (later 71st (West Riding) Regiment, RA) and ceased to be a Royal Horse Artillery battery.)

The brigade (with the Hampshire Battery) joined the Yeomanry Mounted Division at Khan Yunis on 5 July. Essex Battery, RHA remained with 52nd (Lowland) Division until 17 September 1917 when it joined 7th Mounted Brigade which had returned to Egypt from Salonika on 29 June.

=== Yeomanry Mounted / 1st Mounted / 4th Cavalry Divisions ===
Berkshire, RHA (four 13 pounders) joined the Yeomanry Mounted Division with 6th Mounted Brigade on 27 June 1917 and transferred to XX Brigade when it joined the division on 5 July 1917. Likewise, Leicestershire, RHA (also four 13 pounders) transferred from ANZAC Mounted Division on 20 June 1916 and joined the brigade on 5 July 1917. The brigade remained with the division when it was restructured and indianized (Note: British divisions were converted to the British Indian Army standard whereby brigades only retained one British regiment or battalion and most support units were Indian (artillery excepted).) as the 1st Mounted Division (from 24 April 1918) and later renamed as 4th Cavalry Division (23 July 1918).

During its time with the Yeomanry Mounted Division, the division served as part of the Egyptian Expeditionary Force in Palestine. From 31 October it took part in the Third Battle of Gaza, including the Battle of Beersheba (in GHQ Reserve) and the Capture of the Sheria Position under the Desert Mounted Corps (DMC). Still with the DMC, it took part in the Battle of Mughar Ridge on 13 and 14 November and the Battle of Nebi Samwil from 17 to 24 November. From 27 to 29 November, it withstood the Turkish counter-attacks during the Capture of Jerusalem.

Once the division was restructured and renamed, it served with the DMC for the rest of the war, taking part in the Second Transjordan Raid (30 April to 4 May 1918) and the Final Offensive, in particular the Battle of Megiddo (19 to 25 September) and the Capture of Damascus (1 October).

The 4th Cavalry Division remained in Palestine on occupation duties after the end of the war. However, demobilization began immediately and most of the British war time units had left by May 1919. The Berkshire and Leicestershire batteries were reduced to cadre in Egypt on 14 October 1919. The Headquarters was disbanded on 2 November 1919.

== Bibliography ==
- Becke, Archibald F. (1936). Order of Battle of Divisions Part 2A. The Territorial Force Mounted Divisions and the 1st-Line Territorial Force Divisions (42–56). London: HMSO. OCLC 4405016.
- Clarke, W.G. (1993). Horse Gunners: The Royal Horse Artillery, 200 Years of Panache and Professionalism. Woolwich: The Royal Artillery Institution. ISBN 09520762-0-9.
- Farndale, General Sir Martin (1988). The Forgotten Fronts and the Home Base, 1914–18. History of the Royal Regiment of Artillery. Woolwich: The Royal Artillery Institution. ISBN 1-870114-05-1.
- Perry, F.W. (1993). Order of Battle of Divisions Part 5B. Indian Army Divisions. Newport: Ray Westlake Military Books. ISBN 1-871167-23-X.
- Frederick, J.B.M. (1984). Lineage Book of British Land Forces 1660–1978. Wakefield, Yorkshire: Microform Academic Publishers. ISBN 1-85117-009-X.
