= West Riding Royal Horse Artillery =

Former British Army horse artillery battery

West Riding Royal Horse Artillery (T.F.) 1/1st West Riding RHA (T.F.)
- Active: 21 July 1908 – 30 December 1916
- Country: United Kingdom
- Branch: British Army
- Type: Artillery
- Size: Battery
- Part of: Yorkshire Mounted Brigade; V Lowland Brigade, RFA (T.F.)
- peacetime HQ: Rotherham
- Equipment: Ordnance QF 15-pounder Ordnance QF 18-pounder
- Engagements: First World War Sinai and Palestine 1916 Battle of Romani

The West Riding Royal Horse Artillery was a Territorial Force Royal Horse Artillery battery that was formed in the West Riding of Yorkshire in 1908. It saw active service as field artillery with 52nd (Lowland) Division in Egypt during the First World War before being broken up at the end of 1916. Post-war, it was reconstituted as a Royal Field Artillery battery.

== History ==
=== Formation ===
The Territorial Force (TF) was formed on 1 April 1908 following the enactment of the Territorial and Reserve Forces Act 1907 (7 Edw.7, c.9) which combined and re-organised the old Volunteer Force, the Honourable Artillery Company and the Yeomanry. On formation, the TF contained 14 infantry divisions and 14 mounted yeomanry brigades. Each yeomanry brigade included a horse artillery battery and an ammunition column.

On 18 March 1908, West Riding Royal Horse Artillery (Territorial Force) was proposed as a new unit to be raised from amongst the 4th West Yorkshire Artillery Volunteers, RGA. It was recognized by the Army Council on 21 July 1908. The unit consisted of

Battery HQ at Wentworth Woodhouse, Rotherham
West Riding Battery at Rotherham
Yorkshire Mounted Brigade Ammunition Column also at Rotherham

The unit was equipped with four Ehrhardt 15-pounder guns and allocated as artillery support to the Yorkshire Mounted Brigade.

=== First World War ===
The battery was embodied with the Yorkshire Mounted Brigade on 4 August 1914 and apparently remained in Yorkshire. The yeomanry regiments left the brigade for other formations in 1915 and it ceased to exist.

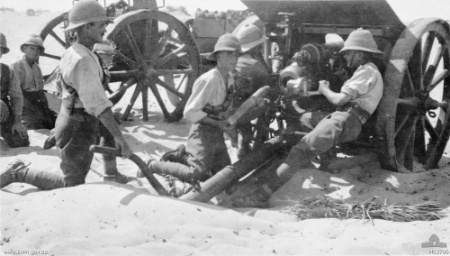
British artillerymen loading an 18 pounder gun at Romani in 1916

The battery, along with the Essex and Hampshire RHA, joined V Lowland Brigade, Royal Field Artillery (T.F.) when it was formed on 13 January 1916 at Leicester. Before departing for the Middle East, the battery were re-equipped with four 18 pounders.

The brigade embarked between 15 and 18 February 1916 at Devonport and arrived at Port Said on 2 March. It joined 52nd (Lowland) Division at El Qantara on 17 March in the Suez Canal Defences. The brigade was renumbered as CCLXIII Brigade, RFA (T.F.) on 28 May and the battery as C/CCLXIII Battery on the same date. On 15 September, the brigade was renumbered as CCLXIV Brigade, RFA (T.F.) (the battery became C/CCLXIV Battery) and on 30 December back to CCLXIII Brigade, RFA (T.F.).

On that date, the battery was broken up: one section (Note: A Subsection consisted of a single gun and limber drawn by six horses (with three drivers), eight gunners (riding on the limber or mounted on their own horses), and an ammunition wagon also drawn by six horses (with three drivers). Two Subsections formed a Section and in a six gun battery these would be designated as Left, Centre and Right Sections.) went to A Battery (formerly Hampshire RHA) and the other section to B Battery (former Essex RHA). The brigade now consisted of two batteries of six 18 pounders each.

While with 52nd (Lowland) Division, the battery took part in the Battle of Romani on 4 and 5 August 1916.

=== 2nd Line ===
In accordance with the Territorial and Reserve Forces Act 1907 (7 Edw.7, c.9) which brought the Territorial Force into being, the TF was intended to be a home defence force for service during wartime and members could not be compelled to serve outside the country. However, on the outbreak of war on 4 August 1914, many members volunteered for Imperial Service. Therefore, TF units were split into 1st Line (liable for overseas service) and 2nd Line (home service for those unable or unwilling to serve overseas) units. 2nd Line units performed the home defence role, although in fact most of these were also posted abroad in due course.

Unlike almost all of the other Territorial Force RHA Batteries, the West Riding RHA did not form a 2nd line in the First World War. (Note: The Ayrshire Royal Horse Artillery was the only other Territorial Force RHA battery that did not form a 2nd line in First World War.)

=== Post war ===
West Riding RHA was not reconstituted until 7 February 1920 when it formed 12th West Riding Battery in 3rd West Riding Brigade, RFA (later 71st (West Riding) Regiment, RA) and ceased to be a Royal Horse Artillery battery. 3rd West Riding Brigade, RFA had also originated in the 4th West Yorkshire Artillery Volunteers in 1908.

== See also ==
- List of Territorial Force horse artillery batteries 1908

== Bibliography ==
- Becke, Major A.F. (1988) [1936]. Order of Battle of Divisions Part 2A. The Territorial Force Mounted Divisions and the 1st-Line Territorial Force Divisions (42–56). London: His Majesty's Stationery Office. ISBN 1-871167-12-4.
- Clarke, Dale (2004). British Artillery 1914–19 Field Army Artillery. Vol. 94 of New Vanguard Series. Oxford: Osprey Publishing. ISBN 1-84176-688-7.
- Clarke, W.G. (1993). Horse Gunners: The Royal Horse Artillery, 200 Years of Panache and Professionalism. Woolwich: The Royal Artillery Institution. ISBN 09520762-0-9.
- Farndale, General Sir Martin (1988). The Forgotten Fronts and the Home Base, 1914–18. History of the Royal Regiment of Artillery. Woolwich: The Royal Artillery Institution. ISBN 1-870114-05-1.
- Frederick, J.B.M. (1984). Lineage Book of British Land Forces 1660–1978. Wakefield, Yorkshire: Microform Academic Publishers. ISBN 1-85117-009-X.
- James, Brigadier E.A. (1978). British Regiments 1914–18. London: Samson Books Limited. ISBN 0-906304-03-2.
- Rinaldi, Richard A (2008). Order of Battle of the British Army 1914. Ravi Rikhye. ISBN 978-0-97760728-0.
- Westlake, Ray (1992). British Territorial Units 1914–18. Osprey Publishing. ISBN 978-1-85532-168-7.
