= Essex Royal Horse Artillery =

Former British Army horse artillery battery

Essex Royal Horse Artillery (T.F.) 1/1st Essex RHA (T.F.)
- Active: 7 July 1908 – 8 October 1919
- Country: United Kingdom
- Branch: British Army
- Type: Artillery
- Size: Battery
- Part of: Eastern Mounted Brigade; V Lowland Brigade, RFA (T.F.); 7th Mounted Brigade; 2nd Mounted / 5th Cavalry Division
- peacetime HQ: Chelmsford
- Equipment: Ordnance QF 15-pounder Ordnance QF 18-pounder Ordnance QF 13-pounder
- Engagements: First World War Sinai and Palestine 1916-18 Battle of Romani First and Second Battles of Gaza Affair of Abu Tellul Battle of Megiddo Capture of Damascus Occupation of Aleppo

The Essex Royal Horse Artillery was a Territorial Force Royal Horse Artillery battery that was formed in Essex in 1908. It saw active service during the First World War in Egypt and Palestine from 1916 to 1918, initially as field artillery with 52nd (Lowland) Division before being converted back to horse artillery and serving with the 2nd Mounted / 5th Cavalry Division. A second line battery, 2/1st Essex RHA, served on the Western Front in 1917 and 1918 as part of an Army Field Artillery Brigade.

== History ==
=== Formation ===
The Territorial Force (TF) was formed on 1 April 1908 following the enactment of the Territorial and Reserve Forces Act 1907 (7 Edw.7, c.9) which combined and re-organised the old Volunteer Force, the Honourable Artillery Company and the Yeomanry. On formation, the TF contained 14 infantry divisions and 14 mounted yeomanry brigades. Each yeomanry brigade included a horse artillery battery and an ammunition column.

On 18 March 1908, Essex Royal Horse Artillery (Territorial Force) was proposed as a new unit and it was recognized by the Army Council on 7 July 1908. The unit consisted of

Battery HQ at Market Road, Chelmsford
Essex Battery

No. 1 Section (Note: A Subsection consisted of a single gun and limber drawn by six horses (with three drivers), eight gunners (riding on the limber or mounted on their own horses), and an ammunition wagon also drawn by six horses (with three drivers). Two Subsections formed a Section and in a six gun battery these would be designated as Left, Centre and Right Sections.) at Colchester
No. 2 Section at Chelmsford

Eastern Mounted Brigade Ammunition Column

A Sub-Section at Colchester
B Sub-Section at Chelmsford

Apparently, the Essex Yeomanry provided a number of members for the newly raised unit. The battery was equipped with four Ehrhardt 15-pounder guns and allocated as artillery support to the Eastern Mounted Brigade.

=== First World War ===
In accordance with the Territorial and Reserve Forces Act 1907 (7 Edw.7, c.9) which brought the Territorial Force into being, the TF was intended to be a home defence force for service during wartime and members could not be compelled to serve outside the country. However, on the outbreak of war on 4 August 1914, many members volunteered for Imperial Service. Therefore, TF units were split into 1st Line (liable for overseas service) and 2nd Line (home service for those unable or unwilling to serve overseas) units. 2nd Line units performed the home defence role, although in fact most of these were also posted abroad in due course.

==== 1/1st Essex ====
The 1st Line battery was embodied with the Eastern Mounted Brigade on 4 August 1914 at the outbreak of the First World War. The brigade concentrated in the Ipswich area of Suffolk and joined the 1st Mounted Division on formation on 5 August. In late August it moved to Woodbridge. In September 1915, the Eastern Mounted Brigade (without the battery) was dismounted and left Suffolk for Liverpool en route to Gallipoli. The brigade was replaced in the 1st Mounted Division by 2/1st South Wales Mounted Brigade and the battery was assigned to it. The battery remained with 2/1st South Wales Mounted Brigade in East Anglia until January 1916.

Field artillery

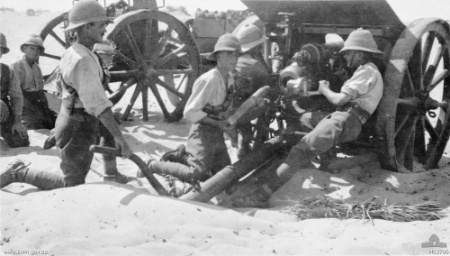
British artillerymen loading an 18 pounder gun at Romani in 1916

The battery, along with the Hampshire and West Riding RHA, joined V Lowland Brigade, Royal Field Artillery (T.F.) when it was formed on 13 January 1916 at Leicester. Before departing for the Middle East, the battery were re-equipped with four 18 pounders.

The brigade embarked between 15 and 18 February 1916 at Devonport and arrived at Port Said on 2 March. It joined 52nd (Lowland) Division at El Qantara on 17 March in the Suez Canal Defences. The brigade was renumbered as CCLXIII Brigade, RFA (T.F.) on 28 May and the battery as B/CCLXIII Battery on the same date. On 15 September, the brigade was renumbered as CCLXIV Brigade, RFA (T.F.) (the battery became B/CCLXIV Battery) and on 30 December back to CCLXIII Brigade, RFA (T.F.). The battery was, once again, designated as B/CCLXIII Battery.

On that date, C Battery (formerly West Riding RHA) was broken up and one section joined the battery to make it up to six 18 pounders; the other section joined A Battery (former Hampshire RHA). The brigade now consisted of two batteries of six 18 pounders each.

While with 52nd (Lowland) Division, the division took part in the Battle of Romani (4 and 5 August 1916) and the First (26 and 27 March 1917) and Second (17 – 19 April 1917) Battles of Gaza.

Horse artillery

At the end of June 1917, arrangements were made to reform the brigade as a horse artillery brigade. On 5 July 1917, the brigade exchanged its 18 pounders for 13 pounders and was redesignated as XX Brigade, RHA (T.F.). Essex and Hampshire Batteries RHA were reformed with four 13 pounders each; West Riding Battery RHA was not reformed at this point. (Note: West Riding RHA was not reconstituted until 7 February 1920 when it formed 12th West Riding Battery in 3rd West Riding Brigade, RFA (later 71st (West Riding) Regiment, RA) and ceased to be a Royal Horse Artillery battery.)

XX Brigade, RHA (with the Hampshire Battery) joined the Yeomanry Mounted Division at Khan Yunis on 5 July. However, Essex Battery, RHA remained with 52nd (Lowland) Division until 17 September 1917 when it joined 7th Mounted Brigade which had returned to Egypt from Salonika on 29 June. The brigade served variously as Corps Troops with the Desert Mounted Corps and XXI Corps and on attachment to the Yeomanry Mounted Division. The battery was still assigned to 7th Mounted Brigade when it joined 2nd Mounted Division on 24 April 1918. At this point, the battery became divisional troops.

Essex RHA remained with 2nd Mounted Division (and 5th Cavalry Division when it was renamed on 22 July 1918) throughout the rest of the Sinai and Palestine Campaign. As part of the Desert Mounted Corps, it took part in the Affair of Abu Tellul (14 July) and the Final Offensive including the Battle of Megiddo (19 to 25 September), the Capture of Damascus (1 October), and the Occupation of Aleppo (26 October).

The division remained in Palestine on occupation duties after the end of the war. However, demobilization began immediately and most of the British war time units had left by the middle of 1919. The battery was reduced to cadre in Egypt on 8 October 1919.

==== 2/1st Essex ====
2/1st Essex RHA (T.F.)
- Active: March 1915 – 1919
- Country: United Kingdom
- Branch: British Army
- Type: Artillery
- Size: Battery
- Part of: 2/1st Eastern Mounted Brigade; CCXCVI Brigade, RFA (T.F.); CCXCVIII Brigade, RFA (T.F.)
- Equipment: Ordnance QF 15-pounder Ordnance QF 18-pounder
- Engagements: First World War Western Front 1917-18

Essex RHA formed a 2nd line in 1914, initially designated as the Essex (Reserve) Battery RHA and later given a fractional designation as 2/1st Essex Battery, RHA in March 1915.

The pre-war Territorial Force infantry divisions were generally (Note: 51st (Highland) Division was exceptional in that it had three field and one mountain artillery brigade.) supported by four field artillery brigades. (Note: The basic organic unit of the Royal Artillery was, and is, the Battery. When grouped together they formed brigades, in the same way that infantry battalions or cavalry regiments were grouped together in brigades. At the outbreak of the First World War, a field artillery brigade of headquarters (4 officers, 37 other ranks), three batteries (5 and 193 each), and a brigade ammunition column (4 and 154) had a total strength just under 800 so was broadly comparable to an infantry battalion (just over 1,000) or a cavalry regiment (about 550). Like an infantry battalion, an artillery brigade was usually commanded by a Lieutenant-Colonel. Artillery brigades were redesignated as regiments in 1938. Note that the battery strength refers to a battery of six guns; a four-gun battery would be about two thirds of this.) These were numbered I, II, III and IV within each division and consisted of three gun brigades (each of three batteries, equipped with four 15-pounder guns) and a howitzer brigade (two batteries of four 5" howitzers). Artillery for 2nd Line divisions were formed in a similar manner, with a fractional designation, for example the 2/II North Midland Brigade, RFA (with 2/1st, 2/2nd and 2/3rd Staffordshire Batteries, RFA) for 59th (2nd North Midland) Division. Territorial Force artillery brigades were later numbered in a consecutive sequence, and batteries lettered, so for the above example, CCXCVI Brigade, RFA with A, B and C batteries.

The battery, equipped with four 18 pounders, joined CCXCVI Brigade, RFA in 59th (2nd North Midland) Division in Ireland in early May 1916 and became D/CCXCVI Battery. On 10 July 1916, the battery transferred to CCXCVIII Brigade, RFA (former 2/IV North Midland Brigade) as B/CCXCVIII Battery. At this point, CCXCVIII Brigade consisted of three 2nd Line RHA batteries: 2/1st Hampshire as A Battery, 2/1st Essex as B Battery and 2/1st Glamorganshire as C Battery.

In January 1917, the division returned to England. Before leaving Ireland, the battery was made up to six 18 pounders with one section of C/CCXCVIII Battery (former 2/1st Glamorganshire Battery, RHA). (Note: Elsewhere, Becke says that 2/1st Glamorganshire RHA was renamed as 815th Battery, RFA and remained in the United Kingdom throughout the war.)

On 2 February 1917, the division started moving overseas and by 3 March had completed its concentration in France. Shortly after arrival on the Western Front, on 4 April 1917, CCXCVIII Brigade left 59th (2nd North Midlnd) Division and became an Army Field Artillery Brigade. (Note: Army Field Artillery Brigades were artillery brigades that were excess to the needs of the divisions, withdrawn to form an artillery reserve.) At the Armistice, the battery (six 18 pounders) was still with CCXCVIII Army Brigade, RFA serving as Army Troops with the Fourth Army.

=== Post war ===
The battery was reduced to cadre in Egypt on 8 October 1919. It was not reconstituted in the Territorial Force in 1920. However, in 1925, 339th Battery of 85th (East Anglian) Field Brigade, RA, at Colchester was redesignated 339th (Essex RHA) Battery. In 1932 339th Bty was transferred to 104th (Essex Yeomanry) Field Brigade, RA, which became 104th (Essex Yeomanry) Regiment, Royal Horse Artillery in 1938.

== See also ==
- List of Territorial Force horse artillery batteries 1908

== Bibliography ==
- Becke, Archibald F. (1936). Order of Battle of Divisions Part 2A. The Territorial Force Mounted Divisions and the 1st-Line Territorial Force Divisions (42–56). London: HMSO. OCLC 4405016.
- Becke, Archibald F. (1937). Order of Battle of Divisions Part 2B. The 2nd-Line Territorial Force Divisions (57th–69th) with The Home-Service Divisions (71st–73rd) and 74th and 75th Divisions. London: HMSO. OCLC 4405016.
- Clarke, Dale (2004). British Artillery 1914–19 Field Army Artillery. Vol. 94 of New Vanguard Series. Oxford: Osprey Publishing. ISBN 1-84176-688-7.
- Clarke, W.G. (1993). Horse Gunners: The Royal Horse Artillery, 200 Years of Panache and Professionalism. Woolwich: The Royal Artillery Institution. ISBN 09520762-0-9.
- Farndale, General Sir Martin (1988). The Forgotten Fronts and the Home Base, 1914–18. History of the Royal Regiment of Artillery. Woolwich: The Royal Artillery Institution. ISBN 1-870114-05-1.
- Frederick, J.B.M. (1984). Lineage Book of British Land Forces 1660–1978. Wakefield, Yorkshire: Microform Academic Publishers. ISBN 1-85117-009-X.
- Perry, F.W. (1993). Order of Battle of Divisions Part 5B. Indian Army Divisions. Newport: Ray Westlake Military Books. ISBN 1-871167-23-X.
- Rinaldi, Richard A (2008). Order of Battle of the British Army 1914. Ravi Rikhye. ISBN 978-0-97760728-0.
- Westlake, Ray (1992). British Territorial Units 1914–18. Osprey Publishing. ISBN 978-1-85532-168-7.
- Order of Battle of the British Armies in France, November 11th, 1918. France: General Staff, GHQ. 1918.
