= Wessex (Hampshire) Heavy Battery, Royal Garrison Artillery =

Wessex (Hampshire) Heavy Battery, RGA
- Cap Badge of the Royal Artillery
- Active: 1908–1919
- Country: United Kingdom
- Branch: Territorial Force
- Role: Heavy Artillery
- Size: 2 Batteries
- Garrison/HQ: Cosham
- Engagements: Western Front

The Wessex (Hampshire) Heavy Battery, Royal Garrison Artillery was a volunteer unit of the British Territorial Force formed in 1908. It fought on the Western Front during World War I.

== Origin ==
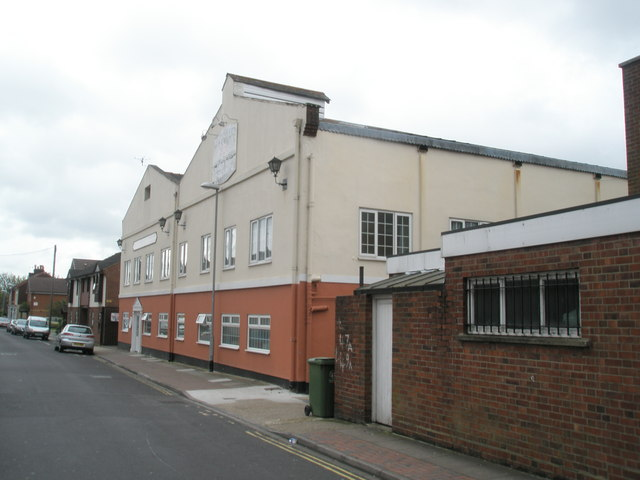
Drill hall and headquarters in Cosham, photographed in 2014

When the Territorial Force was created from the Volunteer Force in 1908 by the Haldane Reforms, each infantry division was allocated a heavy battery of the Royal Garrison Artillery (RGA). One company of the former 2nd Hampshire Royal Garrison Artillery (Volunteers) was allocated to this role with the Wessex Division. The battery was formed at Southsea, although the HQ later moved to Cosham. TF heavy batteries of the RGA were each equipped with four Boer War-era 4.7-inch guns and included their own ammunition column.

== Mobilisation ==
On 26 July 1914, the Wessex Division was on Salisbury Plain carrying out its annual training camp. Three days later, because of the worsening international situation, it was ordered to take 'precautionary measures'. On 30 July the division took up its precautionary positions in Somerset, Devon and Cornwall. On August the infantry were ordered to their war stations at the defended ports, and the following day war was declared against Germany. By 10 August the Wessex Division was once more concentrating on Salisbury Plain, but now it was training for war.

The formation of reserve or 2nd Line TF units was authorised by the War Office on 31 August 1914. At first they comprised those members of the pre-war parent unit who had not volunteered for or were unfit for overseas service, who trained the flood of volunteers that came forward. The 2nd Wessex Division began to form in September 1914 as a duplicate of the 1st: the units took a '2/' prefix to distinguish them from the 1st Line unit. The heavy battery therefore formed the 1/1st and 2/1st Wessex (Hampshire) Heavy Batteries at Cosham.

On 24 September, at the special request of Lord Kitchener, the Secretary of State for War, the 1st Wessex Division accepted liability for service in India in order to relieve Regular troops from garrison duty there. The infantry and field artillery embarked on 9 October. However, the heavy battery was not required in India, and remained in the UK. Similarly, on 25 November the War Office decided to send the 2nd Wessex Division, although untrained, to India to release further Regular forces for service on the Western Front. The division embarked on 12 December; once again, the 2/1st Wessex Heavy Battery did not accompany it, but remained in the UK undergoing training.

The Regular troops arriving from India had no supporting arms, and so TF units provided these for the new divisions that were being formed. The 1/1st Wessex Heavy Battery sent eight officers and 170 other ranks to the 28th Division to form the Divisional Ammunition Column, which mobilised at Slough on 29 December and embarked for France on 17 January 1915. Although many of these men returned later, the battery had to be practically reconstituted with drafts from the 2/1st Battery.

== Home service ==
On 7 April 1915, the two Wessex Heavy Batteries joined the 2/2nd London Division (which became the 60th (2/2nd London) Division in August). This 2nd Line formation had just assembled at its war station around Hemel Hempstead to take its place in Third Army, Central Force. As late as December 1915 the 1/1st Wessex Heavy Battery still had no guns or equipment, and only had its personnel, horses and harness.

In January 1916, the 60th Division moved to Salisbury Plain to undergo final training before going overseas. On 24 January the two Wessex Heavy Batteries transferred to 61st (2nd South Midland) Division at Chelmsford, until that division also went to Salisbury Plain in February.

Finally, the 1/1st Wessex Heavy Battery received orders to proceed overseas, and it embarked on 22 April 1916. The 2/1st Battery remained in the UK, providing drafts of reinforcements to the 1/1st Battery until October 1916, when it was broken up and dispersed to other units.

== Western Front ==
On landing in France, 1/1st Wessex Heavy Bty joined Second Army and was assigned to 41st Heavy Artillery Group (HAG) on 25 April 1916.

HAGs were composed of various mixtures of heavy guns and howitzers and were assigned to Army and Corps HQs for counter-battery fire and direct bombardment of targets. At the time the policy was to move batteries between HAGs as required. 1/1st Wessex Heavy Bty moved to 13th HAG on 5 October, to 33rd HAG on 19 November and to 71st HAG on 11 January 1917, all within Second Army.

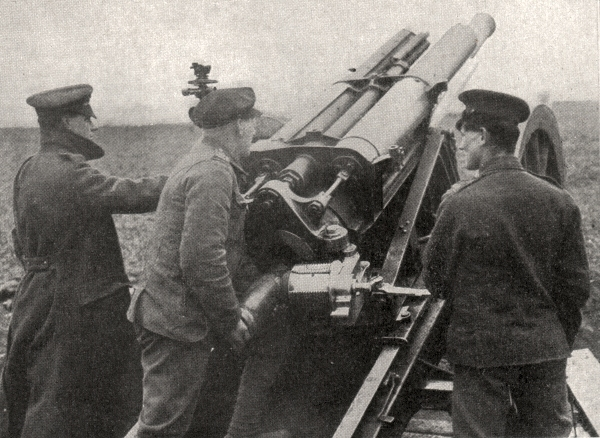
Loading a 60-pounder gun

On 3 March 1917 the battery was made up to six guns by the addition of a section from 200th Heavy Battery, RGA, a 'Kitchener's Army' unit that had just arrived from the UK. (Note: 200th Heavy Bty had been formed at Woolwich on 24 June 1916; its other sections were posted to 1/1st West Riding and 1/1st Welsh Hvy Btys.) At this time, if not before, the obsolescent 4.7-inch guns of the TF heavy batteries were replaced by the modern 60-pounder. On 5 March the enlarged battery was transferred to 52nd HAG, but returned to 71st HAG on 26 March. Now the heavy artillery was shifted continually as the great battles of 1917 were fought. 1/1st Wessex Hy Bty moved to 88th HAG on 13 June, to 73rd HAG in Third Amy on 24 June, 28th HAG in Fifth Amy on 7 July (in time for the Third Ypres Offensive), 4th HAG in Third Army on 4 September, to 63rd HAG (First Army) on 4 November. Finally the battery was sent for rest and refit from 24 December 1917 to 6 January 1918.

On 8 January 1918 the battery joined 86th HAG in Third Army. Under a new policy, the HAGs were kept together, and reverted to the familiar artillery designation of 'Brigade' from 1 February. 86th (Mobile) Brigade, RGA, (or LXXXVI Brigade) was a unit of batteries armed with 60-pounders and 6-inch howitzers. 1/1st Wessex stayed with this brigade for the rest of the war.

By this stage of the war, artillery tactics in the BEF had become very sophisticated, and mobile heavy brigades were an integral part of the more open warfare that characterised the latter part of the war (the Allied Hundred Days Offensive). 86th Brigade was part of Fourth Army for the opening of the Battle of Amiens on 8 August 1918. It was then assigned to II Corps in Second Army for the Fifth Battle of Ypres on 28 September, and to XIII Corps in Fourth Army for the Battle of Cambrai, when the brigade was one of those pushed as far forwards as was possible in order to cover the advancing troops. In Second Army's crossing of the Schelde on 31 October, 86th Bde supported the attack of 34th Division: 'Greatly owing to the excellent artillery barrage, the attackers carried al before them' (Official History). At the Battle of the Sambre on 4 November, XVII Corps of Third Army achieved complete success supported by overwhelming weight of artillery, including 86th Bde.

'This superbly well-oiled machine moved relentlessly on – artillery and infantry co-operation reaching a peak hitherto never achieved in the history of war. The Battle of the Sambre was a great British victory, a victory which finally broke the enemy's will to fight' (RA History).

At the time of the Armistice with Germany on 11 November 1918, 1/1st Wessex Hy Bty was still in 86 (Mobile) Bde, RGA, now as part of Second Army.

== Postwar ==
The battery was placed in suspended animation in 1919, and reformed in 1920 as 4 Battery of 1st Wessex Brigade, Royal Field Artillery (also originally formed from part of 2nd Hampshire RGA (V)), later 219 (Hampshire) Battery in 54th (Wessex) Field Brigade, RA.
