= 1st Carnarvonshire Artillery Volunteers =

1st Carnarvonshire Artillery Volunteers 1st Carnarvonshire RGA (V) Welsh (Carnarvonshire) Heavy Battery, RGA
- Active: 12 March 1862 – 1 March 1922
- Country: United Kingdom
- Branch: Volunteer Force; Territorial Force
- Role: Garrison artillery Heavy artillery
- Part of: Welsh Division
- Garrison/HQ: Caernarfon; Bangor, Gwynedd
- Engagements: Battle of the Somme; Battle of the Ancre; Battle of Vimy Ridge; Battle of Hill 70; German Spring Offensive; Hundred Days Offensive

The 1st Carnarvonshire Artillery Volunteers was a part-time unit of the British Army in North Wales from 1862 to 1922. It fought on the Western Front in World War I. Postwar it was amalgamated with the Denbighshire Hussars as a medium artillery regiment that served in World War II.

== Volunteer Force ==
The enthusiasm for the Volunteer movement following an invasion scare in 1859 saw the creation of many Volunteer Corps composed of part-time soldiers eager to supplement the Regular British Army in time of need. One such unit was the 1st Carnarvonshire Artillery Volunteer Corps (Note: The contemporary spelling in all formal documents was 'Carnarvon', not 'Caernarvon', or today's preferred 'Caernarfon'.) (AVC) raised at Carnarvon on 12 March 1862 under Captain William Haywood and 1st Lieutenant William Turner. It was a small unit (51 strong in 1871), and for most of the 1860s and 1870s only had one officer, William Turner, promoted to captain on 13 August 1864, and later Sub-Lieutenant William Owen, commissioned on 20 June 1874. It joined the 1st Administrative Brigade, Anglesey Artillery Volunteers when that was formed on 28 August 1863. However, Volunteer recruitment in Anglesey declined and in 1873 the remaining Anglesey and Carnarvon AVCs were transferred to the Administrative Brigade in Cheshire This was consolidated as the 1st Cheshire and Carnarvonshire Artillery Volunteer Corps in 1880, with 1st Carnarvon AVC providing No 8 Company.

In 1882 the 1st Cheshire and Carnarvonshire was assigned to the Lancashire Division of the Royal Artillery, but when the divisional structure was reduced in 1889 it joined the Southern Division. On 1 June 1899 all the Volunteer artillery units became part of the Royal Garrison Artillery (RGA) and from 1 January 1902 the unit became the 1st Cheshire and Carnarvonshire RGA (Volunteers). However, in 1904 the Carnarvonshire batteries were withdrawn to form a separate unit, the 1st Carnarvonshire RGA (V) of four companies under the command of Lieutenant-Colonel Hugh Savage, VD, with the following organisation:

- Headquarters at Glynne Road, Bangor
- No 1 Company at Bangor, formed from part of No 6 Company
- No 2 Company at Llanfairfechan, formed from part of No 6 Company
- No 3 Company at University College of North Wales, Bangor, formerly No 7 Company
- No 4 Company at Carnarvon and Penygroes, formerly No 8 Company

== Territorial Force ==
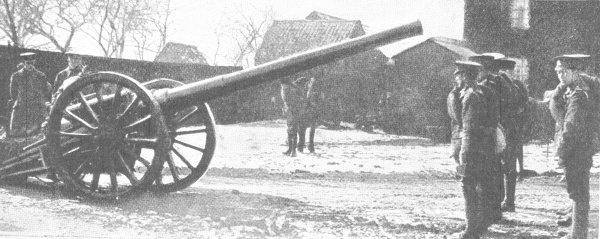
4.7-inch gun on 'Woolwich' carriage, ca 1914.

When the Volunteer Force was subsumed into the new Territorial Force (TF) under the Haldane Reforms of 1908, the 1st Carnarvonshire RGA (V) became the Welsh (Carnarvonshire) Heavy Battery RGA, with its HQ at Bangor and a dedicated Ammunition Column at Argyll Road, Llandudno. The former No 3 Company at Bangor College transferred to the Officers' Training Corps. The new unit provided the heavy battery in the TF's Welsh Division, equipped with four 4.7-inch guns.

== World War I ==
=== Mobilisation ===
The units of the Welsh Division had just departed for their annual summer camp when the order to mobilise was received on 4 August 1914. They then returned home and assembled at their drill halls to mobilise. The Welsh (Carnarvonshire) Heavy Battery mobilised at Bangor under the command of Major W.H. Hughes, who had held the command since 20 December 1913. The battery immediately went by train to its war station at Scoveston Fort, above the Royal Navy anchorage of Milford Haven. The battery's horse purchaser was able to impress and buy enough horses for the guns and ammunition column in just four days. The men spent September digging gun positions around the anchorage. The two sections being widely separated – a wagon taking 48 hours by road to travel between Pembroke Dock and Scoveston Fort – battery training proved difficult.

By 11 August the Welsh units had completed their concentration and TF members were invited to volunteer for Overseas Service. Four days later the War Office (WO) issued instructions to separate those men who had signed up for Home Service only, and form these into reserve units. Then on 31 August the formation of a reserve or 2nd Line unit was authorised for each 1st Line unit where 60 per cent or more of the men had volunteered for Overseas Service. The titles of these 2nd Line units would be the same as the original, but distinguished by a '2/' prefix. In this way duplicate batteries, brigades and divisions were created, mirroring those TF formations being sent overseas. The Welsh Hvy Bty began forming its 2nd Line battery in October.

=== 1/1st Welsh (Carnarvonshire) Heavy Battery ===
The battery moved on 20 October to Northampton where the Welsh Division had concentrated at to continue its training. The men were billeted on private houses and the horses picqueted on The Racecourse. By the end of November the wagons of the battery and ammunition column were complete and the battery considered itself mobile. On 18 November the division was warned for garrison duty in India, but this was cancelled and in December it moved to Cambridge, the battery moving by train on 21 December, with the men billeted as before and the horses in the open on Coe Fen; battery headquarters (BHQ) was at 8 Brookside, Cambridge. Training continued, and in April 1915 the gunners attended a practice camp at Larkhill.

The Welsh Division (officially the 53rd (Welsh) Division from 14 May 1915) next moved to Bedford, with the 1/1st Welsh Hvy Bty marching via St Neots on 5–6 May; BHQ was established at Kempston. In July the infantry of the division embarked for service at Gallipoli, leaving the divisional artillery behind in Bedford. On 20 November the divisional field artillery left to join the British Expeditionary Force (BEF) on the Western Front, but the heavy battery remained at Bedford with the 2nd Line Welsh Division (now numbered as the 68th (2nd Welsh) Division).

Finally, on 10 February 1916 the battery was warned for overseas service and on 16 October it moved to Woolwich to mobilise for overseas service with the BEF. It embarked on the transport Karnak at Southampton Docks on 26 February, but after three days at anchor was landed again. It re-embarked on 2 February and landed at Le Havre next day. It then went by train to Doullens and by road to join 23rd Heavy Artillery Group (HAG) in Third Army. It went into action on 17 March in the Vimy Ridge area. Major Hughes was evacuated to hospital on 26 March, and Maj G.H. Nugent arrived next day to take command. During May, Maj Nugent took over temporary command of 23rd HAG and XVII Corps Counter-Battery (CB) Group.

==== Somme ====
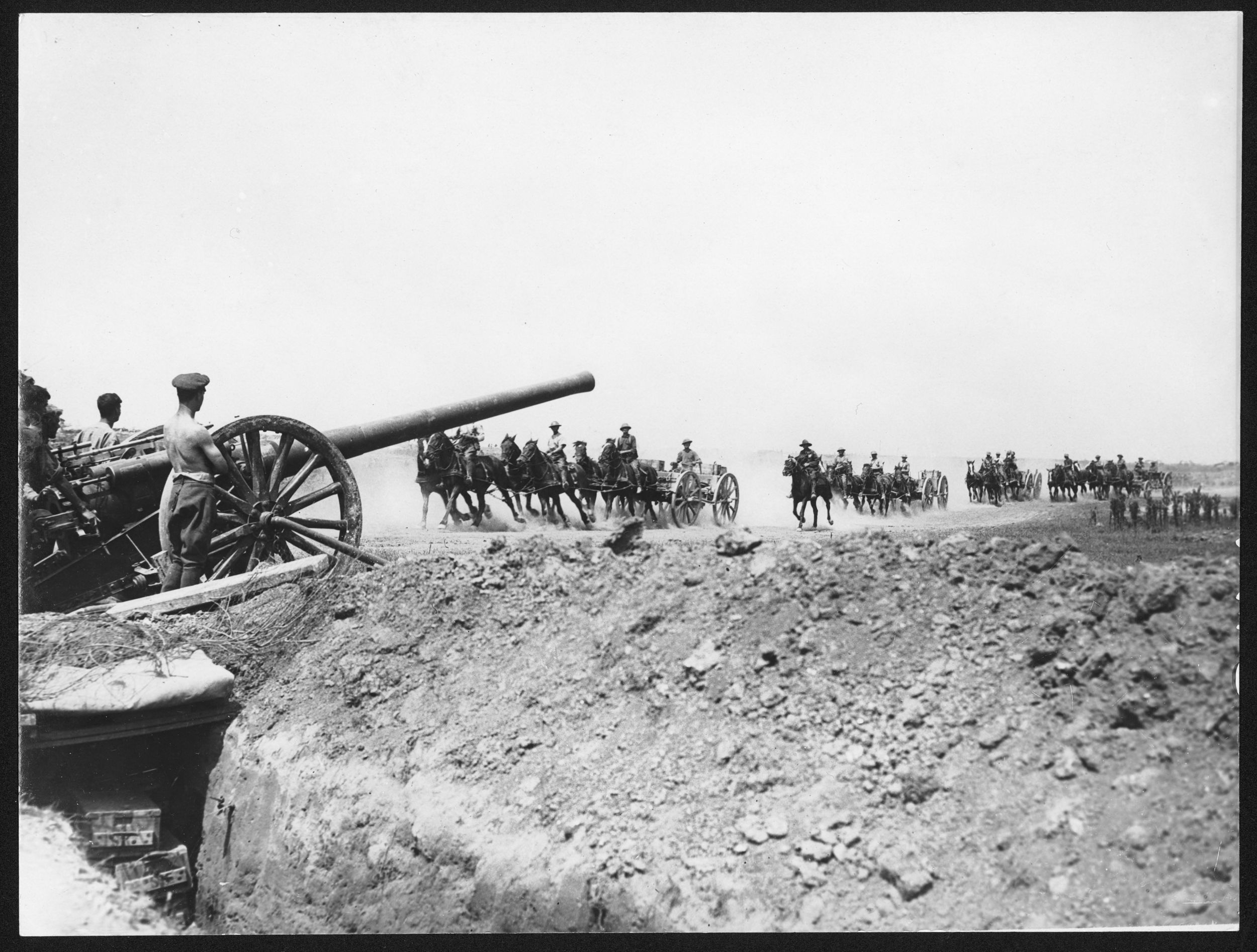
4.7-inch gun on the Somme, 1916.

At the time the policy was to move RGA batteries from one HAG to another as required. 1/1st Welsh Hvy Bty moved to 6th HAG in First Army, then to 17th HAG with Fourth Army, when it joined in preparations for the Battle of the Somme. On 6 June the battery's Left Section and half the ammunition column set off by road to the Somme front, reaching Sarton on 10 June, where they began preparing gun positions for the battery near Colincamps. The other half of the battery joined them on 18 June and the positions were completed and stocked with ammunition by 23 June. From 24 to 30 June the battery bombarded targets in the Beaumont-Hamel sector. On Z Day (1 July) the battery began firing at 06.00 and lengthened its range at 07.30 when the infantry went 'over the top'. By 16.30 it had fired approximately 1000 rounds.

1/1st Welsh Hyv Bty remained active on this front through the summer. On 13 August it was heavily shelled and Maj Nugent was wounded; Capt G. Brymer assumed command and was confirmed in the position on 15 September. The battery was in the bombardment of Beaucourt Redoubt between 05.05 and 08.30 on 3 September, and then engaged in CB fire. On 15 September (the Battle of Flers–Courcelette) it assisted with CB fire in the direction of Courcelette. On 3 October the two guns of Left Section were condemned as unserviceable and sent to the Ordnance workshops, being replaced by two Mk IV 4.7-inch guns.

==== Ancre ====
The battery fired in support of the operations on 13 and 15 November (the Battle of the Ancre) for the final Capture of Beaumont-Hamel and Grandcourt. At the end of the Somme offensive the battery was transferred to 32nd HAG in Fifth Army on 1 December. There were still ongoing Operations on the Ancre: on 3 February 1917 the battery fired 960 rounds in four hours, setting a unit record.

The BEF had begun progressively replacing its obsolescent 4.7-inch guns with 60-pounders during 1916. From 5 February 1917, 25 Other Ranks of 1/1st Welsh Hvy Bty were attached to 25th Hvy Bty for instruction on the 60-pdr. However, it had not received its new guns when the Germans began their planned retreat to the Hindenburg Line (Operation Alberich). The battery followed up and took up positions between Serre and Beaumont-Hamel in what had been the German positions (it was now part of 56th HAG, having transferred on 19 February 1917).

In December 1916 the WO decided that all heavy batteries should be composed of six guns. 1/1st Welsh Hvy Bty received its first four new 60-pdrs on 27 February, and then on 3 March it was joined by a section of one officer and 83 gunners from 200th Hvy Bty (newly arrived in France and immediately broken up (Note: 200th Heavy Bty had been formed at Woolwich on 24 June 1916; its other sections were posted to 1/1st Wessex and 1/1st West Riding Hvy Btys.)) to bring it up to a six-gun establishment. On 7 March it fired off all its 4.7-inch ammunition and passed its old guns over to 1/1st Highland Hvy Bty. Next day it began a four-day march to Verquin to join 31st HAG in First Army on 12 March. That night it emplaced three guns at Bully-Grenay, the other three following on 16 March.

==== Vimy Ridge ====
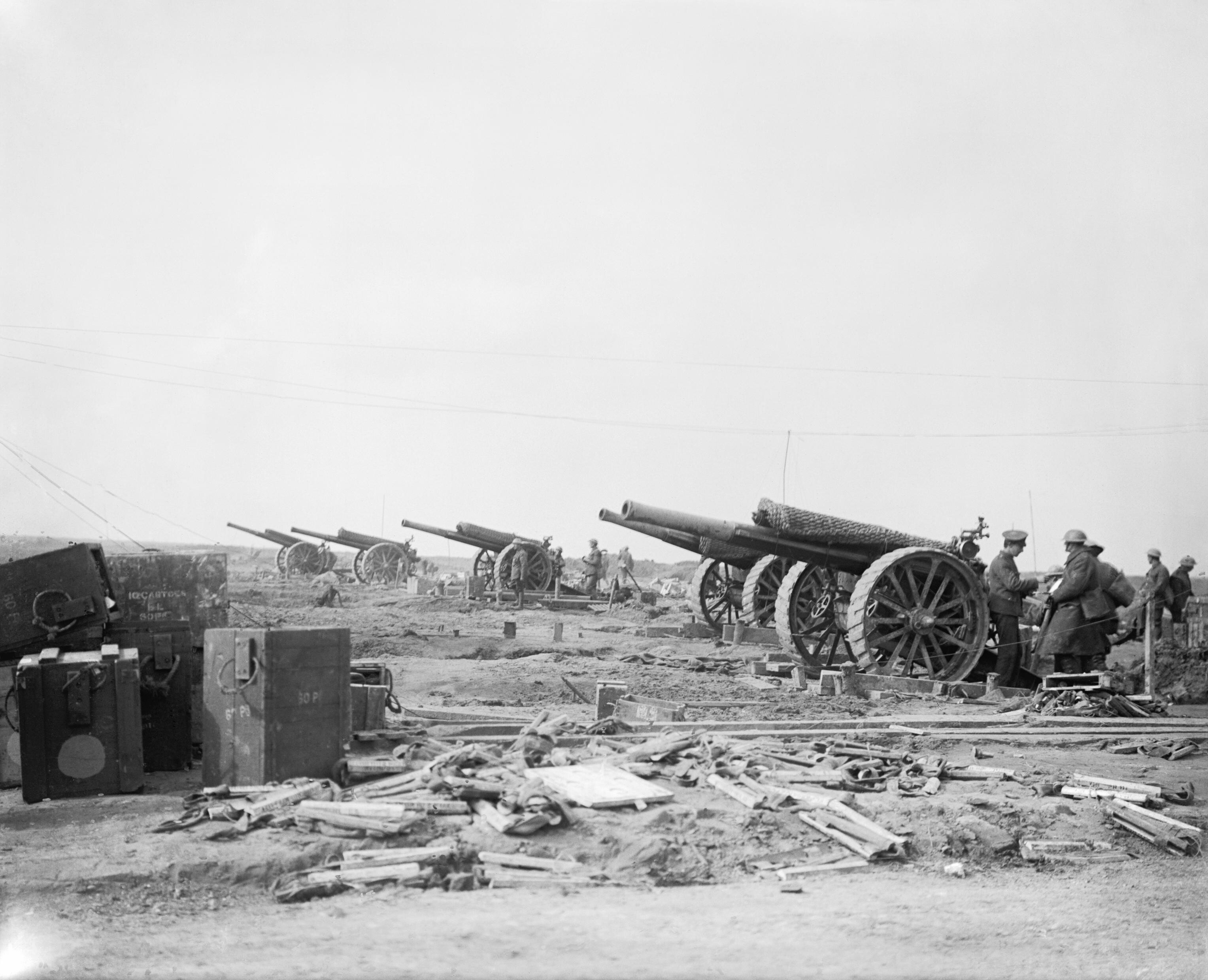
A battery of 60-pounders deployed during the Battles of Vimy and Arras, 1917.

On 20 March the artillery preparation began for the Battle of Vimy Ridge, with the batteries of 31st HAG firing from around Bully-Grenay on the extreme north flank of the attack, from where they could virtually enfilade the German lines in support of I Corps. The artillery plan for the heavy guns emphasised counter-battery fire. At Zero hour, while the field guns laid down a Creeping barrage to protect the advancing infantry, the 60-pounders switched to 'searching' fire on the German rear areas to catch machine gunners and moving infantry. When the British infantry reached their Phase 2 objective (the Blue Line) the field guns would move forward and the 60-pounders move up to occupy their vacated positions. The attack went in on 9 April with I Corps and Canadian Corps successfully capturing Vimy Ridge while Third Army attacked further south near Arras. The only hold-up on 9 April was at Hill 145, near the north end of the Canadian attack, and the capture of this position was completed the next day. During the day the battery suffered several casualties from German CB fire.

As the Arras Offensive continued, the battery advanced three guns to a new position at Cite Calonne on 21 April, the others moving up to Rollencourt on 27 April, and the wagon lines to Petit Sains on 12 May. The battery suffered a number of casualties. The half battery at Cite Calonne was heavily shelled on 11 May when two guns were put out of action, and again on 14 May, this time without casualties.

==== Arras Front ====
On 11 May the battery had been transferred to the command of 15th HAG, and on 16 May the battery personnel were withdrawn and sent to Béthune for rest, returning to their positions on 26 May. The guns continued in action, with a half battery moving up to Grenay on 5 June, joined by the rest on 10 June. On 16 June the battery was heavily shelled, by about 450 rounds from German 5.9-inch and 4.2-inch guns, but there was no serious damage and only one gunner wounded. However, there were a steady trickle of killed and wounded over succeeding days, while First Army carried out a number of operations round Oppy Wood.

On 3 July the battery was ordered to move to Noyelles and take over the guns and positions of 37th Hvy Bty. This was done by half batteries over two successive nights, the wagon lines moving to Vaudricourt, and 1/1st Welsh Hvy Bty came under 67th HAG. On the evening of 23 July the battery was standing by to fire in support of a raid timed for 21.15. At 21.10 it came under heavy CB fire from a German 5.9-inch (150 mm) battery. The gunners lay down round their guns until one minute before Zero, when they manned their guns and opened fire punctually. Later, 88 shell holes were counted between the guns and the battery command post, yet there were no casualties. The battery was congratulated by the corps commander for its steadiness under fire.

The battery continued on the Arras front through the summer, coming under CB fire again on 9 August, when there were no casualties but one gun was temporarily pout out of action. On 15 August it fired in support of the Battle of Hill 70. Low level operations continued on the Arras front while the BEF concentrated on its Ypres Offensive. 1/1st Welsh Hvy Bty pushed forward and came under fire several times, with damage to guns. On 23 October 1/1st Welsh Hvy Bty moved to 11th HAG with Second Army, which was engaged in the final actions of the Battle of Passchendaele.

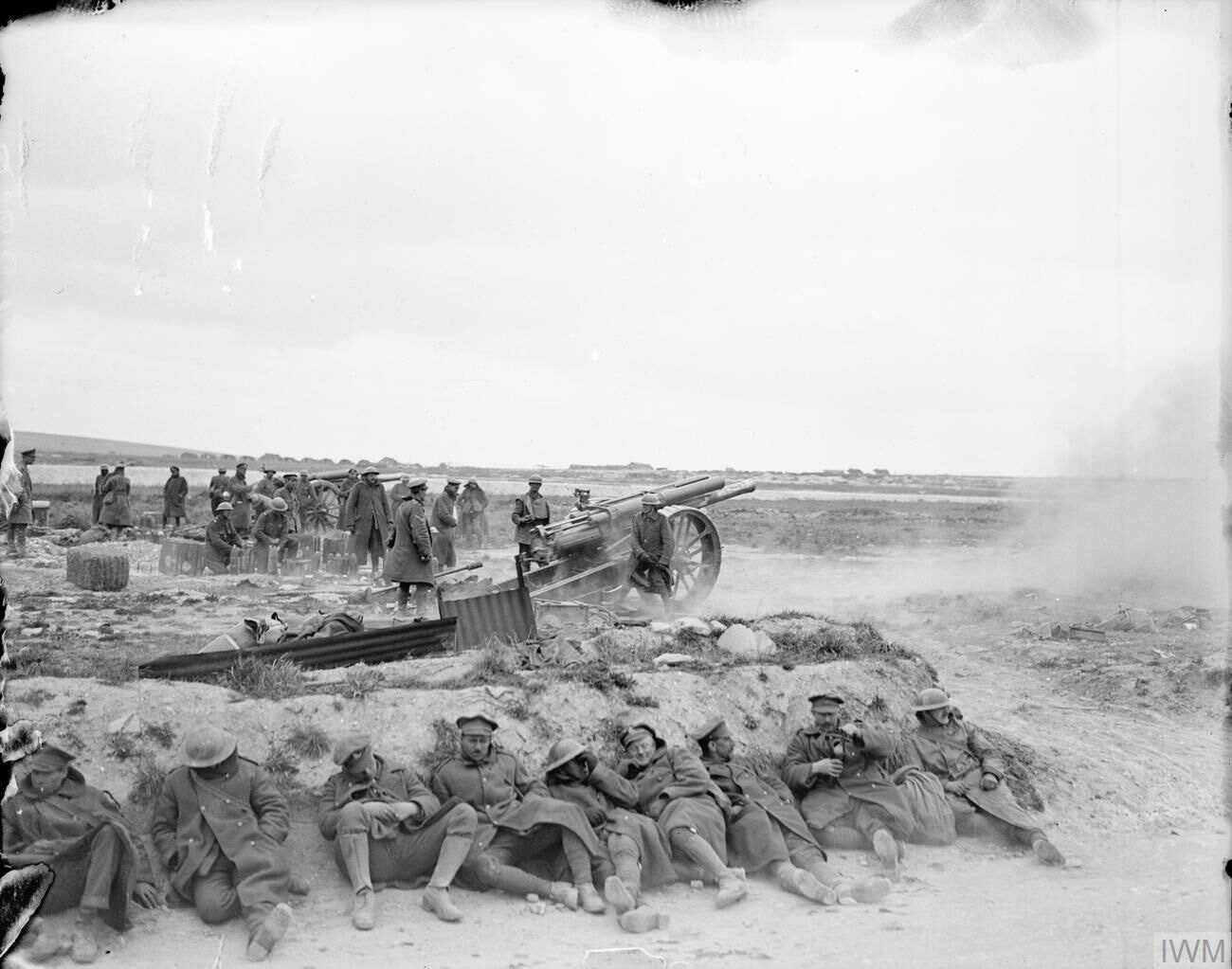
A 60-pounder battery firing in the open during the German Spring Offensive, 1918.

==== Spring Offensive ====
Second Army HQ was sent to the Italian Front at the end of 1917, and Fourth Army took over the Ypres Salient, with 1/1st Welsh Hvy Bty transferring to 53rd HAG on 18 December. By now HAG allocations were becoming more fixed, and on 1 February 1918 the HAGs were converted into permanent RGA brigades, with 53rd becoming a 'Mixed' brigade of 60-pounders and batteries of various calibres of howitzers.

Second Army HQ resumed command of the Ypres sector (including 53rd (Mixed) Bde RGA), in March 1918 and was soon involved in the Battle of the Lys, the second phase of the German spring offensive that involved great loss of ground and rapid retreat for much of the artillery. The German advance on Second Army's front was halted on 29 April.

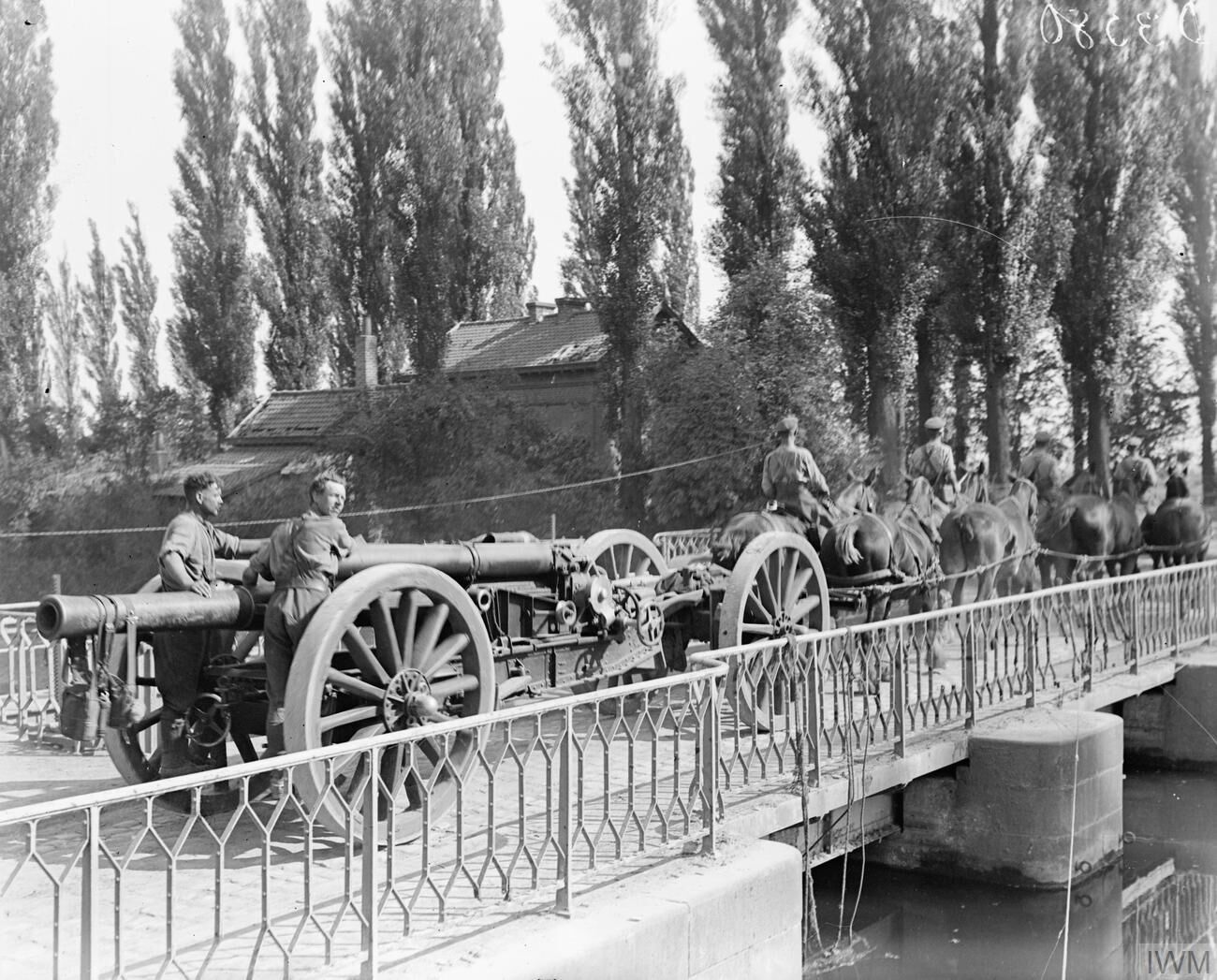
A 60-pounder moving up during the Hundred Days Offensive, 1918.

==== Hundred Days ====
1/1st Welsh Hvy Bty received an extended rest from 27 July to 17 August. Next day Second Army joined in the Allies' Hundred Days Offensive with the capture of several important ridges, and then a succession of attacks in early September. Second Army's contribution to the great series of coordinated offensives starting on 28 September was the Fifth Battle of Ypres (28 September–2 October).

53rd Brigade including 1/1st Welsh Hvy Bty switched to First Army on 2 October and remained with it until the Armistice with Germany, including the Battle of the Selle, when it was under the command of VIII Corps to support XXII Corps crossing of the Echaillon and advance to the Schelde, and the Battle of the Sambre.

The battery was placed in suspended animation in 1919.

=== 2/1st Welsh (Carnarvonshire) Heavy Battery ===
The Welsh Heavy Bty began recruiting its reserve battery at 25 per cent strength in October 1914 and in December was ordered to recruit it up to full strength. The Home and Overseas service batteries were formally separated and the men transferred on 28 February 1915. Later the 3rd Line supplied reinforcement drafts to 1/1st Bty in France. Major J. Samuels took command of 2/1st Welsh Hvy Bty on 5 March.

The battery joined the 68th (2nd Welsh) Division, which concentrated at Northampton in April 1915. It moved to Bedford in the summer to replace the 53rd (Welsh) Division. Training of the units was made difficult by the lack of arms and equipment, although a trickle of horses and saddlery and later some obsolete guns reached the division during the year.

68th (2nd Welsh) Division was now assigned a role in Home Defence and joined First Army (Home Forces) in Central Force, with its units quartered across Eastern England. In May 1917 it transferred to Northern Army (Home Forces), and the heavy battery was stationed at Leiston during the summer before moving into winter quarters at Blythburgh.

2/1st Welsh Hvy Bty remained with 68th Division, supplying drafts to units overseas, until May 1918 when it joined 227th Mixed Brigade. It remained stationed at Blythburgh with four old 4.7-inch guns until the end of the war. It was reduced to a cadre and went to Georgetown, South Wales, for disbandment on 19 September 1919.

== Postwar ==
When the TF was reformed in 1920, the Welsh (Carnarvonshire) RGA was initially reformed as 12th (Carnarvon and Denbigh) Medium Brigade, RGA, which was to have had its HQ and two batteries at Colwyn Bay and one battery at Bangor. When the TF was reconstituted as the Territorial Army (TA) the following year the unit was redesignated 61st Medium Brigade, RGA, with probably only one battery (241 Medium Bty) at Bangor.

However, wartime experience showed that the army had too many mounted units, and only the 14 most senior Yeomanry Cavalry regiments in the TA were retained as horsed cavalry, the remainder being converted to armoured cars or artillery. On 1 March 1922 the Denbighshire Hussars were merged with the new medium brigade to form 61st (Carnarvon & Denbigh Yeomanry) Medium Brigade, RGA with the following organisation:

- HQ at Drill Hall, Colwyn Bay
- 241 (Carnarvon) Medium Bty at Bangor, from 61st Medium Bde
- 242 (Carnarvon) Medium Bty at Llandudo, from Denbighshire Hussars
- 243 (Denbigh) Medium Bty at Colwyn Bay, from Denbighshire Hussars
- 244 (Denbigh) Medium Bty at Wrexham from Denbighshire Hussars

The commanding officer (CO) was Acting Lt-Col W.F. Christian, DSO of the RGA, with Major W.H. Hughes (the Welsh Heavy Battery's prewar CO) as senior major. No prewar officers of the Denbigh Yeomanry were carried over to the new brigade.

=== 241 (Carnarvon) Medium Battery ===
When the TA was doubled in size just before World War II, 241 Medium Bty transferred to the duplicate unit, 69th (Carnarvon & Denbigh Yeomanry) Medium Regiment, which served in the Battle of France, the Middle East, Italy and North West Europe. After the war the Denbighshire and Caernarvonshire Territorials underwent a number of amalgamations until in 1967 they became Q (Denbighshire and Caernarvonshire Yeomanry) Bty in the Flintshire and Denbighshire Yeomanry, RA. In 1971 it was reformed as infantry, forming B (Flintshire and Denbighshire Yeomanry) Company in 3rd Battalion, Royal Welch Fusiliers. The Denbighshire Yeomanry lineage was discontinued from 1999 to 2013, when a new 398 (Flintshire & Denbighshire Yeomanry) Transport Squadron, Royal Logistic Corps, was formed in the Army Reserve.

== Uniforms and insignia ==
The early AVCs wore simplified versions of the blue RA uniform, usually with a large white metal 'grenade' badge on the head-dress. Dress regulations for the artillery volunteers were issued in 1863, and the units adopted the basic RA uniform, with white metal badges for all ranks and silver lace for officers, rather than the brass badges and gold lace of the regulars. Similarly, the 1878 regulations specify that the Austrian knot on the sleeve and the band on the Forage cap were both red for the volunteers, instead of yellow for the regulars and white for the militia. By that date most of the volunteer units had adopted the Busby with a red cloth bag as the full dress head dress, with a large white metal 'grenade' plume holder. However, the blue cloth Home Service helmet with ball top ornament came in to use in 1880; the helmet plate was of a standard pattern, with the unit's title, 'CARNARVONSHIRE ARTILLERY VOLUNTEERS' on the lower scroll. By 1906 most of the volunteer units had adopted the khaki field service dress for all except ceremonial occasions.

== Memorial ==
There is a memorial to the 1/1st Welsh (Caernarvon) Bty, RGA, alongside the main City of Bangor war memorial in the memorial gardens at Deiniol Road, Bangor. The flat lead panel carries 37 names of men who died in World War I and 27 from World War II. It was previously at Bangor Crematorium, and before that at the TA Drill Hall in Glynne Road, Bangor.
