= West Riding Heavy Battery, Royal Garrison Artillery =

West Riding Heavy Battery, RGA 54th (West Riding & Staffordshire) Medium Brigade, RA 54th (Durham & West Riding) Medium Brigade, RA
- Cap Badge of the Royal Artillery
- Active: 1908–1937
- Country: United Kingdom
- Branch: Territorial Army
- Role: Heavy artillery Medium artillery
- Part of: West Riding Division; 49th Divisional Area
- Garrison/HQ: Lumley Barracks, York
- Engagements: Western Front (World War I)

The West Riding Heavy Battery, Royal Garrison Artillery was a part-time unit of Britain's Territorial Force formed in 1908 in the West Riding of Yorkshire. It fought on the Western Front during World War I, and served on in the Territorial Army until the eve of World War II.

== Origin ==
See main article 1st East Riding Artillery Volunteers

When the Territorial Force (TF) was created in 1908 by the Haldane Reforms, each infantry division was allocated a heavy battery of the Royal Garrison Artillery (RGA). The West Riding Division was provided with the West Riding battery, based at York. This unit had originally been formed on 9 February 1861 as the 3rd Yorkshire (West Riding) Artillery Volunteer Corps but for almost 50 years it had been brigaded as part of the 1st East Riding Artillery Volunteers, later the 1st East Riding RGA (Volunteers).

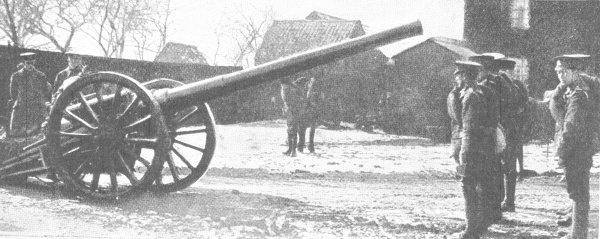
4.7-inch gun on 'Woolwich' carriage, ca 1914.

In 1908–10, while the East and North Riding batteries of the 1st East Riding RGA became part of the II Northumbrian Brigade, Royal Field Artillery in the Northumbrian Division, the York batteries from 11 June 1908 formed one heavy battery, armed with four 4.7-inch guns, together with a dedicated ammunition column.

== World War I ==
=== Mobilisation ===
The West Riding Division went to its annual training camps in late July 1914, but on 3 August the units were instructed to return to their headquarters. The battery was ordered to mobilise at York on 4 August. Under the command of Major W. Graham (a retired captain in the Army Remount Service), it moved to its war station at Hedon on 16 August.

On the outbreak of war, TF units were invited to volunteer for Overseas Service. On 15 August 1914, the War Office issued instructions to separate those men who had signed up for Home Service only, and form these into reserve units, and on 31 August, the formation of a reserve or 2nd Line unit was authorised for each 1st Line unit where 60 per cent or more of the men had volunteered for Overseas Service. The titles of these 2nd Line units would be the same as the original, but distinguished by a '2/' prefix. In this way duplicate units were created, mirroring those being sent overseas. The parent battery was designated 1/1st West Riding Heavy Battery and the new unit recruiting at York became the 2/1st Battery.

=== 1/1st West Riding Heavy Battery ===
At first, the 1st Line West Riding Division (designated the 49th (West Riding) Division on arrival in France in May 1915) formed part of Central Force in Home Defence, but while working on defences in East Yorkshire it also underwent progressive training. On 31 March 1915 it was informed that it would soon proceed to France and join the British Expeditionary Force (BEF). The heavy battery received its orders on 6 April and disembarked at Le Havre on 17 April.

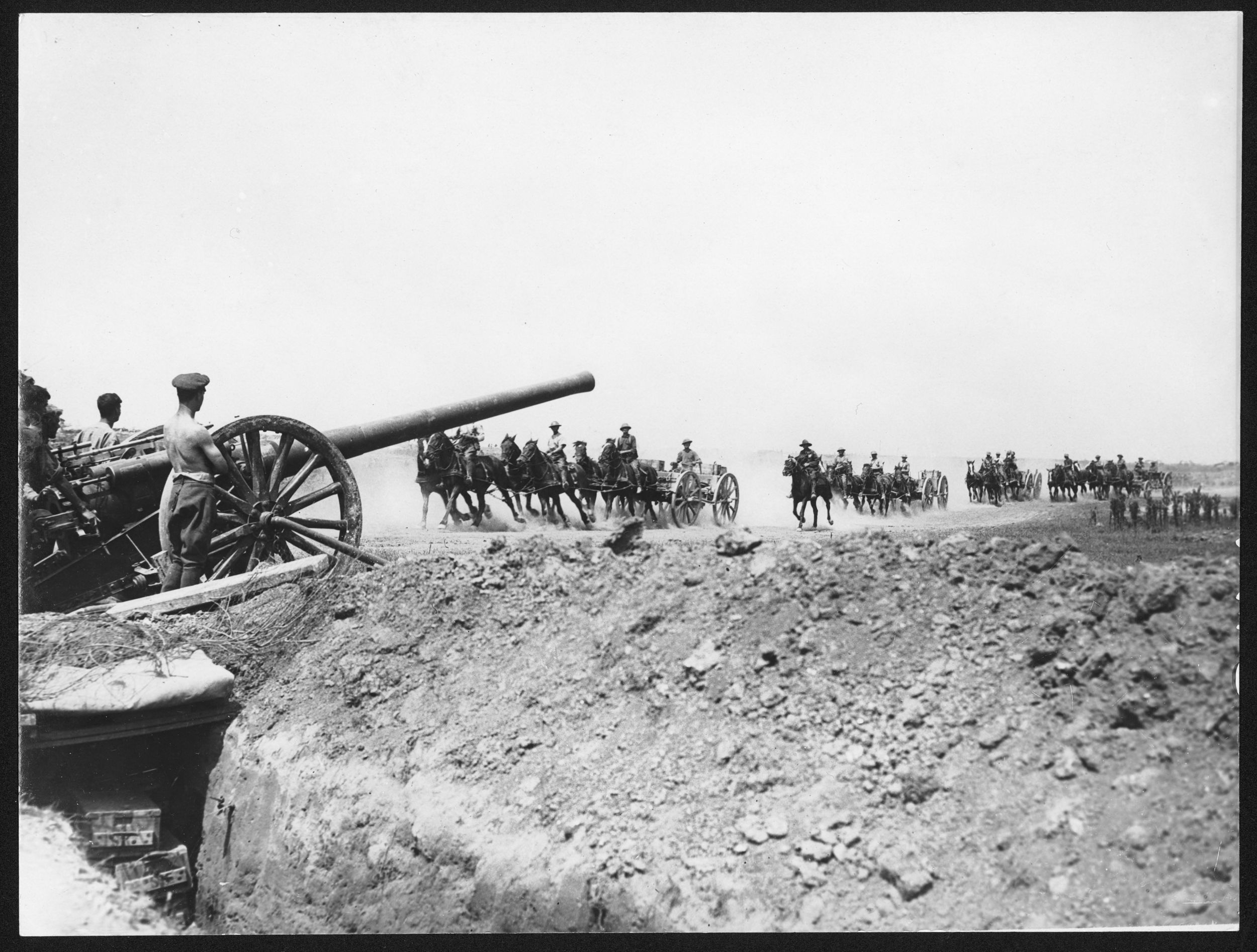
4.7-inch gun on the Somme, 1917.

However, artillery policy in the BEF was to withdraw heavy batteries from the divisions and group them into dedicated heavy artillery brigades, so the battery was immediately posted to VIII Brigade, RGA, in II Group, Heavy Artillery Reserve. II Group consisted of a variety of heavy and siege artillery and was tasked with Counter-battery fire for the Allies' forthcoming Artois Offensive. On the British front this opened with the Battle of Aubers Ridge on 9 May. The group was provided with Royal Flying Corps reconnaissance aircraft fitted with wireless to assist observation in the flat country. Unfortunately the weight of the artillery support was inadequate for the task in hand: the obsolescent 4.7-inch guns were so worn that in many cases the driving bands were stripped off the shells at the muzzle, resulting in extreme inaccuracy. In spite of the counter-battery fire, German guns were able to open up on the British trenches, which were soon packed with wounded men from the first attacking wave, and support troops waiting to follow up. A second attempt to attack in the afternoon was hampered by the shortage of artillery ammunition to repeat the bombardment.

1/1st West Riding Battery returned to 49th Division on 13 May for the continuation of the offensive on 15 May (the Battle of Festubert). The division's role in this operation was confined to localised trench warfare, one short advance by two companies on 24 May being supported by 96 guns. On 28 June the battery permanently left 49th Division and joined VIII Bde.

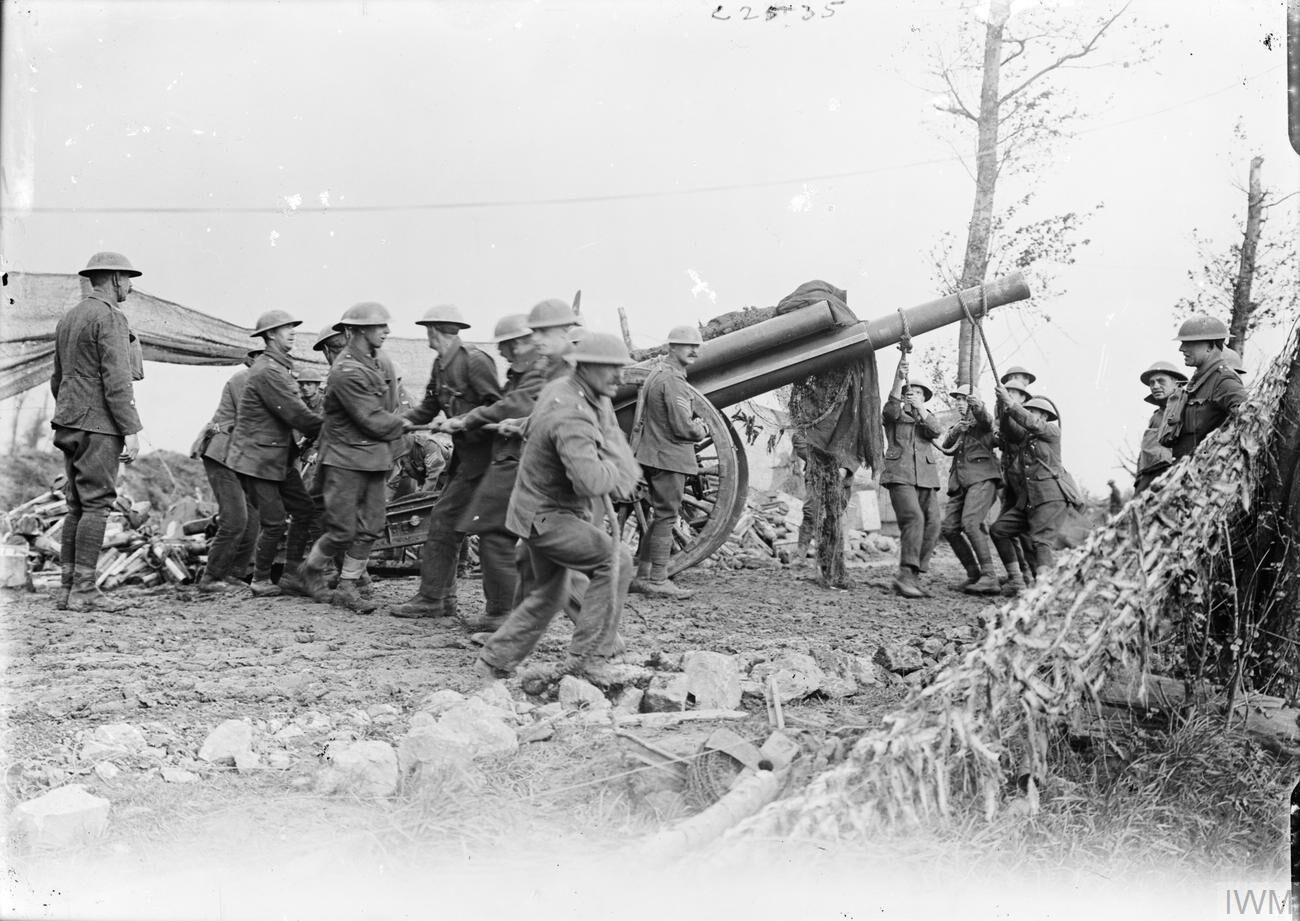
Moving a 60-pounder gun out of its emplacement, 1917.

The obsolescent 4.7-inch guns were progressively replaced in the BEF by 60-pounders during 1915–16. The policy at the time was to move batteries between heavy artillery brigades (later termed Heavy Artillery Groups or HAGs) as required. The 1/1st West Riding Bty transferred to 27th HA Bde on 3 March 1916, then to 9th HAG on 21 April and 2nd HAG in First Army on 6 June, moving with it to Reserve Army (later Fifth Army) on 10 September. The battery remained with 2nd HAG until the end of the year, being rested from 11 December to 4 January 1917.

The battery then joined 55th HAG on 6 February 1917 in time for a minor operation at Miraumont on 17–18 February. 55th and three other HAGs bombarded enemy gun positions, but a thaw had turned the ground to mud, surprise had been lost, and the wire-cutting bombardment had been ineffective, so the infantry attack by II Corps failed.

The battery was brought up to a strength of six guns on 28 February 1917 when it was joined by a section from 200th Heavy Battery, RGA, which had just arrived in France. (Note: 200th Heavy Bty had been formed at Woolwich on 24 June 1916; itsother sections were posted to 1/1st Wessex and 1/1st Welsh Hvy Btys.) On 25 March 1917 the augmented 1/1st West Riding Bty joined 12th HAG, which was one of the groups assigned to support XVII Corps' successful attack on the first day of the Battle of Arras.

1/1st West Riding Bty transferred to 28th HAG on 8 August 1917, with which it remained (apart from short attachments) until the end of the war. In August 1917, 28th HAG was supporting Fifth Army in the dreadful Third Ypres Offensive, moving to Second Army when that took over part of the line on 16 September for the artillery-led battles of the Menin Road Ridge, Polygon Wood, Broodseinde and Poelcappelle before the offensive bogged down in the two Battles of Passchendaele. 1/1st West Riding Battery was withdrawn for rest and refitting on 8 November. 28th Brigade reverted to Fourth Army during the winter of 1917–18.

HAGs became RGA Brigades again on 1 February 1918, by which time the 28th was a 'Mixed' brigade containing both 60-pounder gun and 6-inch howitzer batteries. It transferred to First Army on 1 May. On 28 June 1918, 28th was one of the RGA brigades supporting an operation by XV Corps just east of the forest of Nieppe designed to improve the British line (the action of La Becque).

28th (Mixed) Brigade joined Fifth Army on 7 July 1918 and remained with it until the Armistice with Germany on 11 November 1918. 1/1st West Riding Bty was detached to 49th Bde RGA (normally composed of 8-inch howitzers) with Fourth Army from 21 August to 16 September, during the Second Battle of the Somme returning to 28th Bde thereafter. It was with 28th Bde during Fifth Army's pursuit of the defeated German army towards the Scheldt in October 1918, when the 'heavies' were principally employed on harassing fire on the roads and tracks the Germans were using, and on concentrations of fire on headquarters and exits from villages, while trying to avoid civilian casualties.

When the BEF demobilised in 1919, the battery was placed in suspended animation.

=== 2/1st West Riding Heavy Battery ===
The 2/1st West Riding Heavy Battery began to form once the 1/1st Battery had volunteered for overseas service, and it served with the 62nd (2nd West Riding) Division. Although early recruitment to the 62nd Division was generally good, this was tempered by the need for critical workers to be released back to industry, and to provide drafts for the 49th Division in France. Training was also hampered by the lack of guns and equipment. In March 1915 the division moved into billets around Derbyshire and Nottingham for training, then in May to camps in 'The Dukeries' area before concentrating round Retford in October. The division moved to the Newcastle upon Tyne area in December, where it dug entrenched lines in the Tyne Defences.

Early in 1916 the division moved to Larkhill Camp on Salisbury Plain for battle training, but the continual drain of drafts for the BEF held back the completion of this training and in June it moved to the East Coast defences round Lowestoft. In October it moved inland to the Bedford area to complete its equipment for overseas service.

However, when the 62nd Division finally embarked for France in January 1917 the heavy battery did not accompany it, but was detached and remained in England. It served in the Tyne Defences, being stationed at Blyth, Northumberland (where its four old 4.7-inch guns supplemented the coast defence battery equipped with two 6-inch guns) and then at Whitburn, South Tyneside until the end of the war.

The 2/1st West Riding Battery was disbanded in 1919.

== Postwar ==
When the renamed Territorial Army (TA) was formed in 1920–2, the former West Riding Heavy Battery was reconstituted on 7 February 1920 as two batteries, based at York and Huddersfield. It was combined with two batteries reconstituted from the former North Midland Heavy Battery to form the 9th (West Riding & Staffordshire) Medium Brigade, RGA, renumbered 54th the following year:

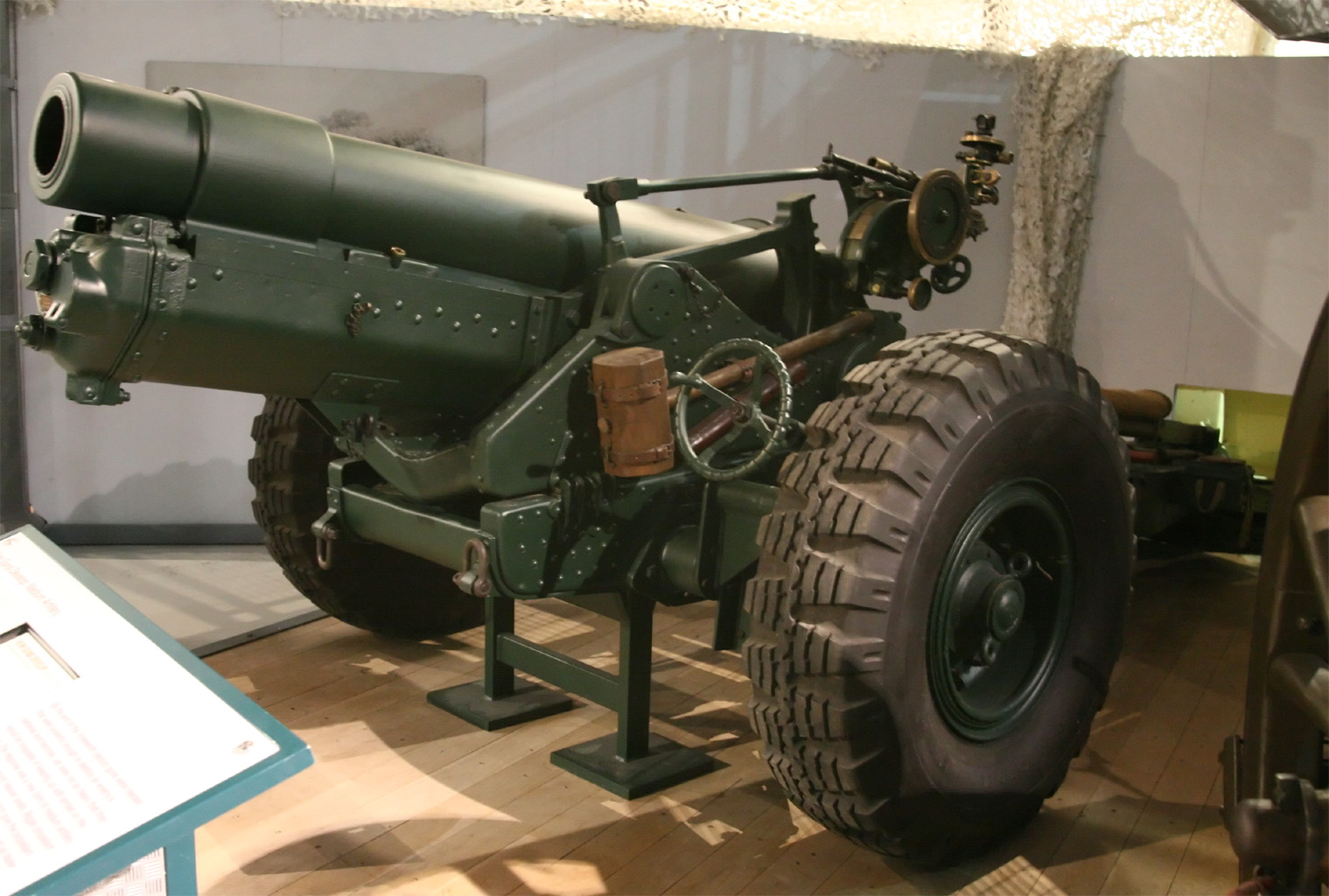
6 inch howitzer on post-war pneumatic tyres, preserved at the Royal Artillery Museum.

54th (West Riding & Staffordshire) Medium Brigade, RGA

- Brigade Headquarters at Lumley Barracks, York
- 213 (1st West Riding) Medium Battery at Lumley Barracks
- 214 (2nd West Riding) Medium Battery (Howitzers) at Drill Hall, Huddersfield
- 215 (1st Staffordshire) Medium Battery (Howitzers) at Drill Hall, Hartshill, Staffordshire
- 216 (2nd Staffordshire) Medium Battery (Howitzers) at Drill Hall, Stoke-on-Trent

The RGA was subsumed into the Royal Artillery (RA) in 1924. In these postwar years the medium artillery was still equipped with wartime 60-pounder guns and 6-inch howitzers.

54th Medium Bde HQ and the two West Yorkshire batteries were in 49th Divisional Area, while the two Staffordshire batteries were in 46th Divisional Area. This awkward arrangement persisted until 1932 when the brigade was split up, the two Staffordshire batteries becoming 51st (Midland) Medium Brigade, while the West Riding batteries were joined by two from County Durham, giving the following organisation:

54th (Durham & West Riding) Medium Brigade, RA

- Brigade Headquarters at Lumley Barracks, York
- 186 (Durham) Medium Battery (Howitzers) at The Armoury, West Hartlepool, from the Durham Heavy Brigade
- 213 (1st West Riding) Medium Battery at Lumley Barracks
- 214 (2nd West Riding) Medium Battery (Howitzers) at Drill Hall, Huddersfield
- 219 (Durham) Medium Battery (Howitzers) at West Hartlepool, from 55th (Northumbrian) Medium Brigade.

== Disbandment ==
The need for increased Anti-Aircraft (AA) provision for Britain's cities saw a further reorganisation of TA artillery units in the late 1930s. This resulted in the breaking up of 54th Medium Brigade in October 1937:

- Brigade HQ contributed to 73rd AA Bde
- 213 (1st West Riding) Bty formed 221 AA Battery in 62nd (Northumbrian) AA Bde
- 186 and 219 (Durham) Btys merged to form 220 AA Battery in 63rd (Northumbrian) AA Bde
- 214 (2nd West Riding) Bty remained a medium howitzer battery and rejoined 51st (Midland) Medium Bde.

== Honorary Colonels ==
The following served as Honorary Colonel of 54th Medium Bde:

- Hon Major-General Aldred Lumley, 10th Earl of Scarbrough, GBE, KCB, TD, appointed on 10 March 1923.
- Hon Brigadier-General Sir Edward Whitley, KCB, CMG, DSO, TD, appointed on 6 March 1929.
