= Anglesey Artillery Volunteers =

- Active: 14 December 1860–October 1878
- Country: United Kingdom
- Branch: Volunteer Force
- Role: Garrison artillery
- Part of: 1st Administrative Brigade, Cheshire Artillery Volunteer Corps
- Garrison/HQ: Holyhead

Commanders
- Notable commanders: Maj Hon William Owen Stanley, MP

The Anglesey Artillery Volunteers was a group of part-time units of the British Army in the Welsh island and county of Anglesey from 1860 to 1878.

== Formation ==
The enthusiasm for the Volunteer movement following an invasion scare in 1859 saw the creation of many Rifle, Artillery and Engineer Volunteer Corps composed of part-time soldiers eager to supplement the Regular British Army in time of need. The Welsh island of Anglesey formed three artillery volunteer corps (AVCs) on 14 December 1860:

- 1st (Holyhead) Anglesey AVC under Captain John Jacobs
- 2nd (Holyhead) Anglesey AVC under Capt Charles Rigby
- 3rd (Beaumaris) Anglesey AVC under Capt William H. Weldon

== Service ==
The Hon William Owen Stanley, MP for Beaumaris, succeeded Jacobs as captain of the 1st AVC on 7 March 1861. On 28 August 1863 the three Anglesey units and the small 1st Carnarvonshire AVC (Note: In the 20th century the spelling was altered to 'Caernarvonshire' and later 'Caernarfonshire'.) at Caernarfon, just across the Menai Strait, were brought together as the 1st Administrative Brigade, Anglesey Artillery Volunteers, (Note: In Royal Artillery terminology, a 'brigade' was a group of independent batteries grouped together for administrative rather than tactical purposes, the officer in command normally being of a lower rank than the brigadier-general or major-general usually associated with command of an infantry or cavalry brigade.) under the command of Capt Stanley, who was promoted to major. The admin brigade had its headquarters (HQ) at Holyhead.

However, interest in the 2nd AVC fell away and it was disbanded by July 1868. This meant that the 1st Admin Bde only contained three batteries, and in 1873 it was absorbed into the 1st Administrative Brigade, Cheshire Artillery Volunteer Corps . Recruitment in Anglesey continued to decline and the 1st (Holyhead) AVC disappeared in 1875. By 1878 most of the 3rd (Beaumaris) AVC were actually Carnarvonshire men from Bangor and the surrounding district. In November that year it was formally redesignated as the 2nd Carnarvonshire AVC, and no artillery volunteer units remained headquartered in Anglesey. When the 1st Cheshire Admin Bde was consolidated as the 1st Cheshire and Carnarvonshire AVC in 1880, the 2nd Carnarvon provided Nos 6 and 7 Companies at Bangor.
