= North Midland (Staffordshire) Royal Garrison Artillery =

North Midland (Staffordshire) RGA
- Active: 1908–1950
- Country: United Kingdom
- Branch: Territorial Army
- Role: Heavy artillery Medium artillery
- Size: Battery, later two Regiments
- Garrison/HQ: Stoke-on-Trent
- Engagements: WWI: Western Front; WWII: Battle of France; Tunisian Campaign; Italian Campaign; North West Europe

The North Midland (Staffordshire) Heavy Battery was a Territorial Force (TF) unit of the Royal Garrison Artillery (RGA) formed in Staffordshire in 1908. It fought on the Western Front during World War I. Converted to medium artillery in the 1920s, the unit took part in the Battle of France and Dunkirk Evacuation in the early part of World War II, before returning to action in North Africa and Italy, and finally in North West Europe.

== Origin ==
When the TF was created in 1908 as part of the Haldane Reforms, each of its infantry divisions included a heavy artillery battery in its establishment. For the North Midland Division, a new unit was raised at Hartshill, Stoke-on-Trent, under the title of the North Midland (Staffordshire) Heavy Battery, RGA.

== World War I ==
The battery, consisting of four 4.7-inch guns, mobilised at the beginning of World War I, and was quartered at Bishop's Stortford with the rest of the North Midland Division. On 31 August 1914, all TF units were authorised to raise 2nd Line units, upon which the parent battery was designated 1/1st North Midland Heavy Battery and the new unit recruiting at Hartshill became the 2/1st Battery.

=== 1/1st North Midland Heavy Battery ===
The battery went to France with the North Midland Division, landing at Le Havre on 1 March 1915. On arrival in France, the division was designated 46th (North Midland) Division. The battery first went into action on 23 March. However, artillery policy in the British Expeditionary Force was to withdraw heavy batteries from the divisions and allocate them to heavy brigades (later Heavy Artillery Reserve Groups (HAGs)). So, on 18 April, the battery left 46th Division and after short attachments to other infantry divisions became part of XIII Heavy Brigade, RGA.

The obsolescent 4.7-inch guns were progressively replaced in the BEF by 60-pounders during 1915-16. The battery was brought up to a strength of six guns on 14 February 1917, when it was joined by a section of 123rd Heavy Battery, RGA.

The policy was to move batteries between HAGs as required, though by late 1917 their allocations became more fixed. From 22 December 1917 until the Armistice, 1/1st North Midland Bty was in 41st HAG, which became 41st Mobile Brigade on 1 February 1918, usually attached to Second Army or Fourth Army.

When the BEF demobilised in 1919, the battery was placed in suspended animation.

=== 2/1st North Midland Heavy Battery ===
Formed at Hartshill, Stoke-on-Trent on 31 August 1914, the 2nd-Line battery was assigned to the 2nd-Line North Midland Division, which was later numbered 59th (2nd North Midland) Division. At first, the recruits had to train on 'Quaker' guns – logs of wood mounted on any available wheels. The division concentrated around Luton in January 1915, where it was tasked with the defense of London; 2/1st Battery relocating to Gadebridge Camp, Hemel Hempstead on 5 February. Here it received four 4.7 inch guns. It trained with the 59th Division until April 1916, but when the Division was posted to Ireland, 2/1st Battery proceeded to France independently, landing at Le Havre on 30 May. It joined VI Corps heavy artillery at Dainville near Arras and was assigned to 8th HAG on 3 June 1916 as part of Third Army. Here, they handed their 4.7 inch guns over to 119th Heavy Battery and three days later took delivery of four 60-pounders. The Battery went into action for the first time on 5 June 1916 when Left Section at Dainville and Right Section at Berneville began engaging German artillery south of Arras in preparation for Third Army's attack on Gommecourt. The battery was brought up to a strength of six guns on 31 July 1916 when it was joined by a section from 149th Heavy Battery, which became Centre Section, and it maintained counter-battery fire in support of troops holding Arras until 12 September 1916.

At midnight, on 12/13 September 1916, the battery was transferred from VI Corps to VII Corps and moved from Arras, first to Humbercamps and then to the Bayencourt/ Hebuterne area. Here, they took part in counter-battery work against German artillery in support of the attacks at Flers-Courcelette, Morval and Thiepval Ridge by Fourth and Reserve Armies. By 1 December 1916, the battery was back at Dainville; moved to Bienvillers on 9 December for operations against Monchy; and back to Dainville again by 15 December. By the year-end, they were back with VI Corps once more. Like the 1/1st Battery, the 2/1st was moved from one HAG to another, transferring to the 65th HAG on 24 November 1916 and to 35th HAG by the end of 1916. On 8 January 1917, the battery transferred back to 8th HAG and was re-allocated to VII Corps. By May 1917, the battery had moved to Henin with Left Section at La Herliere where they transferred to 73rd HAG on 12 May.

Two weeks later, they moved to Belgium, where they were transferred to 93rd HAG, and re-allocated to IX Corps in Second Army. By 7 June 1917, the battery had moved to Hemmel ready to participate in the Battle of Messines Ridge and were transferred to 51st HAG. With the successful conclusion of the Battle of Messines Ridge, 2/1st North Midland Heavy Battery moved to Poperinghe outside Ypres on 9 June 1917, being reallocated to 85th HAG within VIII Corps. On 14 June, they were transferred to 71st HAG within XVIII Corps Heavy Artillery, and relocated on 22 June to Elverdinghe to the north of Ypres. By July, the battery had moved to Vlamertinge, north-east of Ypres where they participated in the Third Battle of Ypres.

They finally settled with the mixed-calibre 4th HAG (4th (Mixed) Brigade from 1 February 1918) on 25 November 1917. The brigade again transferred from Third Army to Second Army on 7 July 1918.

When the BEF demobilised in 1919, the battery was disbanded.

=== 3/1st North Midland Heavy Battery ===
Most TF infantry battalions formed “Third Line” units, which accepted and began training men as soon as their "Second Line" battalions were posted overseas. New recruits were initially posted to these units for training before being sent to a battalion at the front. In addition, men aged 17 or 18 who had volunteered for the TF and were serving in Second Line units were too young to be posted overseas and were transferred to Third Line units until they reached the age of 19. Although Third Line Batteries were not common within the RGA, there is evidence that a 3/1st North Midland Heavy Battery briefly existed during 1916 and was engaged in training, probably at Larkhill, in July 1916. This would have been created after 2/1st Battery left for France on 28 May 1916 and would have begun training men as replacements for the two front line batteries. The 3/1st Battery did not serve overseas and appears to have been short-lived as many Third Line units were merged or disbanded from 1916 onwards.

== Interwar ==
When the renamed Territorial Army was formed in 1920–2, the former North Midland Heavy Battery was reconstituted as two batteries at Stoke-on-Trent:

- 215th (1st Staffordshire) Medium Battery (Howitzers)
- 216th (2nd Staffordshire) Medium Battery (Howitzers)

Although they remained in the 46th Divisional area, the two Staffordshire batteries were brigaded with a headquarters and two batteries (213 and 214) from the West Riding of Yorkshire (49th Divisional area) in the 9th (West Riding and Staffordshire) Medium Brigade, RGA, which was subsequently redesignated as 54th (West Riding and Staffordshire) Medium Brigade, RGA.

This awkward arrangement persisted until 1932 when the brigade was split up, with the two Staffordshire batteries and 204 (Warwickshire) Medium Bty becoming 51st (Midland) Medium Brigade, Royal Artillery. (The number 51 – usually allocated to the senior TA unit – had been made available by the conversion of 51st (Cornwall and Warwickshire) Medium Brigade into 56th (Cornwall) Anti-Aircraft Brigade, releasing 204 Bty to the new 51st.)

Further reorganisations saw the 214th (2nd West Riding) Medium Bty rejoin from 54th Medium Bde in 1937, followed in 1938 by 240th (Shropshire Royal Horse Artillery) Medium Bty transferred from 60th (6th Cheshire and Shropshire) Medium Bde. 204 Battery was converted to anti-aircraft (AA) and joined 73rd AA Regiment. Thus the regiment (as brigades were designated from 1938) had the following organisation:

- HQ at Stoke
- 214th (2nd West Riding) Medium Bty (H) at Huddersfield
- 215th (Staffordshire) Medium Bty (H) at Stoke
- 216th (Staffordshire) Medium Bty (H) at Stoke
- 240th (Shropshire Royal Horse Artillery) Bty (H) at Coleham, Shrewsbury

As part of the expansion of the TA shortly before the outbreak of World War II, the regiment was split into two, 215 (Staffordshire) and 240 (Shropshire Horse Artillery) Btys remaining with 51 Medium Regiment, while 214 (2 West Riding) and 216 (Staffordshire) Btys formed a new 63rd Medium Regiment, RA, both being headquartered at Stoke and forming part of the West Lancashire Area of Western Command.

== World War II ==
=== 51st (Midland) Medium Regiment ===
After training at Stone, Staffordshire, and Bradford-on-Avon, the regiment went to France with the new British Expeditionary Force in February 1940, forming part of III Corps. The regiment was equipped with the 6-inch howitzer.

==== Battle of France ====
In late April, the regiment was detached from the BEF and went with 51st (Highland) Division to take over part of the French Maginot Line in the Saar sector. German patrols were active, and the artillery of both sides were in action. The Battle of France opened with German attacks further north on 10 May. At 04.00 on 13 May a heavy German barrage came down on 51st Division's positions and was answered by the British artillery firing its designated fire-tasks. Three attacks were beaten off, and the sector remained quiet on 14 and 15 May. Late on 15 May the French ordered 51st Division to withdraw to the reserve line. No further attack were made and the division was relieved in the line on 22/23 May.

By now, the German breakthrough (see below) had cut the BEF off from its main bases in Normandy, and 51st Division was unable to rejoin it. While the BEF was evacuated from Dunkirk, there were still 140,000 British troops in France streaming back towards the Normandy coast. 51st Division went into action with the French IX Corps on 4 June in a counter-attack at Mareuil-Caubert intended to recover the Abbeville bridgehead. The attack went in behind an artillery barrage in early morning mist, but despite some successes and good infantry–artillery cooperation, the operation failed in its objectives. The last defenders of Dunkirk surrendered that day, and the following day the Germans renewed their offensive south of the River Somme.

The Germans attacked all along 51st Division's front on 5 June, mauling the division badly, and although the division held along the River Besle, Panzer columns broke through to the south, effectively cutting the division off in the Le Havre peninsula. Too late, the French commanders ordered a retreat. By 9 June, 51st Medium Regiment (without its guns) was part of 'Arkforce' sent to form a defensive line outside Le Havre in an attempt to cover the retreat of 51st Division. Arkforce got into position quickly, but most of the Division was cut off and forced to surrender at Saint-Valery-en-Caux on 12 June. Arkforce was successfully evacuated from Le Havre the following night during Operation Cycle.

==== Home Defence ====
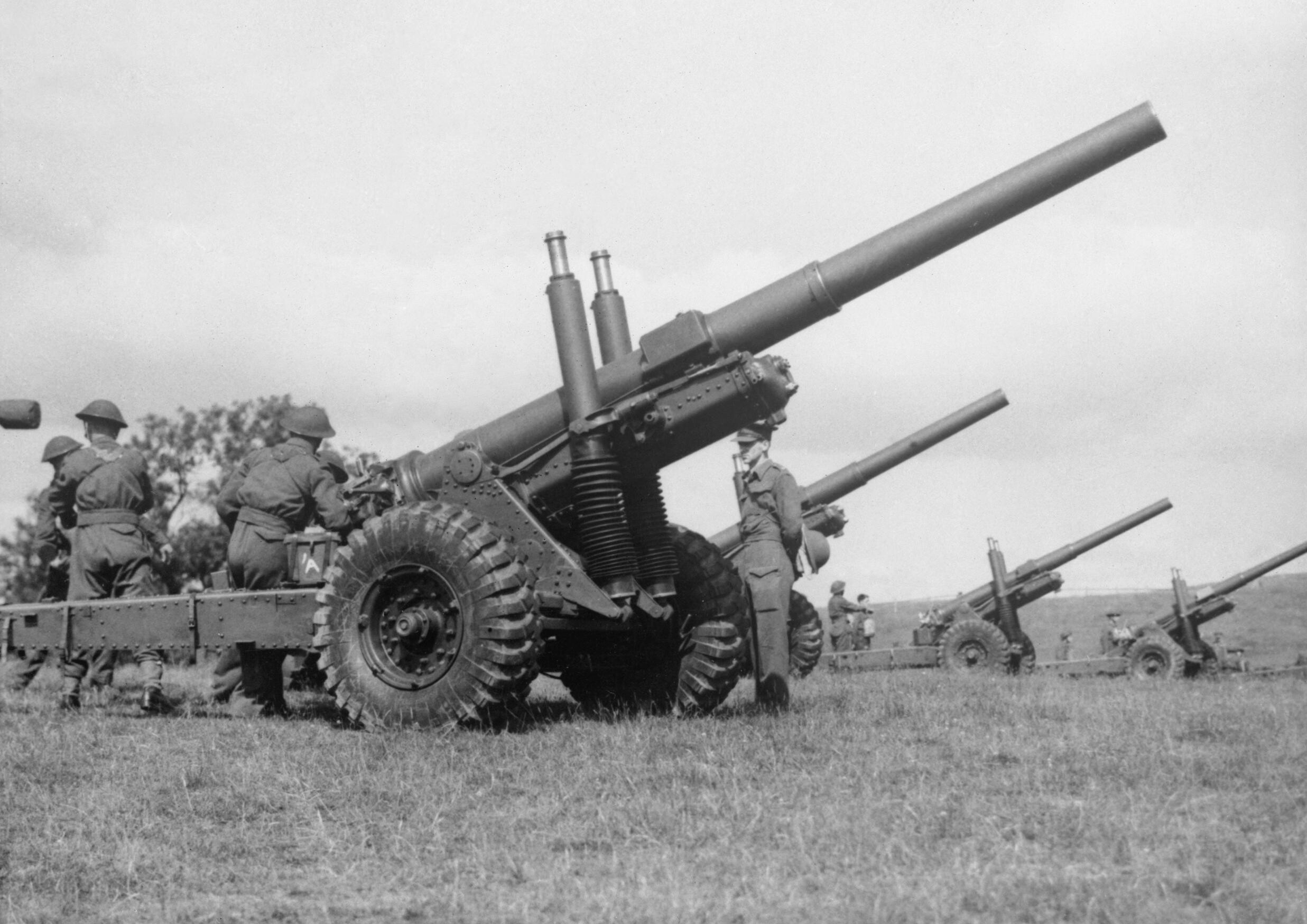
5.5-inch guns of 240th Battery, 51st Medium Regiment, Royal Artillery, at Ellesmere Port in Cheshire, 7 July 1941 (IWM H11489)

During the period of the Battle of Britain and invasion alerts, 51 Medium Regiment was broken up to man coastal defence guns in Western Command, but in December 1940 it assembled at Ellesmere for re-equipping and retraining on the new 5.5-inch gun. The regiment moved to Bedford in July 1941.

==== North Africa ====
In the autumn of 1942, 51 Medium Rgt embarked at Liverpool and arrived in Egypt in October to join Middle East Forces (MEF). In January 1943, it re-equipped with the 4.5-inch gun and moved up to join Eighth Army. As part of 5th Army Group Royal Artillery (AGRA) it took part in the battles of the Mareth Line, Wadi Akarit and Enfidaville in March and April 1943.

==== Italy ====
After the end of the Tunisian Campaign, the regiment reverted to the MEF, but on 7 October 1943 it landed at Salerno as part of 2nd AGRA, where it came under the command of the US Fifth Army. It took part in the Battle of the River Volturno and the 1st Battle of Cassino. After a short spell in 1st AGRA with Eighth Army on the East coast of Italy for the opening of the Battle of the Sangro, the regiment reverted to Fifth Army command at Cassino, the River Garigliano, the final battle of Cassino, and the breaking of the Hitler Line and Gustav Line.

After a short rest with MEF in Egypt and Palestine in May 1944, the regiment returned to Italy to rejoin Eighth Army by July, and was in action again for the assaults at Forlimpopoli, Forlì and Faenza in November 1944.

==== North West Europe ====
Early in 1945, 51 Medium Rgt left Italy to join 9th AGRA in 21st Army Group in North West Europe for the final weeks of the war. On arrival in Germany, it came under the command of 34th Armoured Brigade in Westphalia.

After VE Day, the regiment carried out occupation duties in the Dortmund–Bochum area under 76th Anti-Aircraft Brigade.

51 (Midland) Medium Rgt was placed in suspended animation on 1 April 1946.

=== 63rd (Midland) Medium Regiment ===
==== Battle of France ====
The 63rd Medium Rgt also went to France with the BEF, and when the Battle of France began it was deployed on the Dyle Front with I Corps. When the Germans broke through French lines, the Corps was forced to fall back on successive river lines. By 21 May the BEF was on the Escaut with a strong artillery force, but by then artillery ammunition was running low. On 23 May, the BEF fell back to what were known as the 'Canal Line', and the 'Frontier Line'. British troops in these lines were not seriously attacked, but artillery ammunition was now so short that they could not disrupt enemy movements towards the Belgians. Soon afterwards the Belgians surrendered and German pressure forced the BEF back towards Dunkirk. 5th Division of GHQ Reserve, supported by I Corps' artillery, took up a defensive position on the canals around Ypres on 27 May. A counter-attack that evening supported by I Corps' medium regiments succeeded in steadying the line. The following day the line was held by desperate fighting, of which the Official History says 'The artillery deserve a large share of the credit for holding the German attack. Not only the field regiments but I Corps artillery fired almost continuously till their ammunition was in the end exhausted'. Lieutenant-General Sir Alan Brooke, commander of II Corps wrote in his diary that 5th Division and the Corps artillery 'had been fighting a life and death struggle all day', and noted that I Corps had fired 5000 rounds of medium artillery ammunition in 36 hours. 'There is no doubt that the 5th Division in its fight on the Ypres-Comines Canal saved the II Corps and the B.E.F.' The position was held for three days until the bulk of the BEF had got inside the Dunkirk perimeter. Then the artillery destroyed their guns and took their place in the evacuation from Dunkirk (Operation Dynamo).

==== Home Defence ====
Back in the UK, 63 Medium Rgt served in home defence with Southern Command until 1944. The regiment was granted its 'Midland' subtitle in 1942.

==== North West Europe ====
During the preparations for the Invasion of Normandy, 63rd Medium Rgt was assigned to 21st Army Group in May 1943, landing in France in June 1944 as part of 8th AGRA. The regiment served throughout the North West Europe campaign in support of various operations. For example, 8 AGRA supported VIII Corps during Operation Jupiter (the recapture of Hill 112 on 10 July 1944), 15th (Scottish) Division in Operation Guildford (the capture of Blerick on 2 December 1944), and XII Corps during Operation Plunder (the crossing of the Rhine on 23 March 1945).

63 (Midland) Medium Rgt was placed in suspended animation in 1945 and disbanded in 1947.

== Postwar ==
When the TA was reconstituted in 1947, the Shropshire RHA battery joined 639 Heavy Regiment RA, while the Staffordshire part of 51st Medium Rgt became 351st Medium Regiment RA (Midland) based at Stoke. It formed part of 87 (Field) AGRA. However, the regiment was short-lived, being placed in suspended animation in 1950 and subsequently disbanded.

== Honorary Colonel ==
- William Ward, 3rd Earl of Dudley, MC, TD, a former officer in the 10th Hussars and Staffordshire Yeomanry, was appointed Honorary Colonel of the regiment on 9 October 1933.

== See also ==
Shropshire Royal Horse Artillery
