= Stockport Armoury =

Military installation in Greater Manchester, England

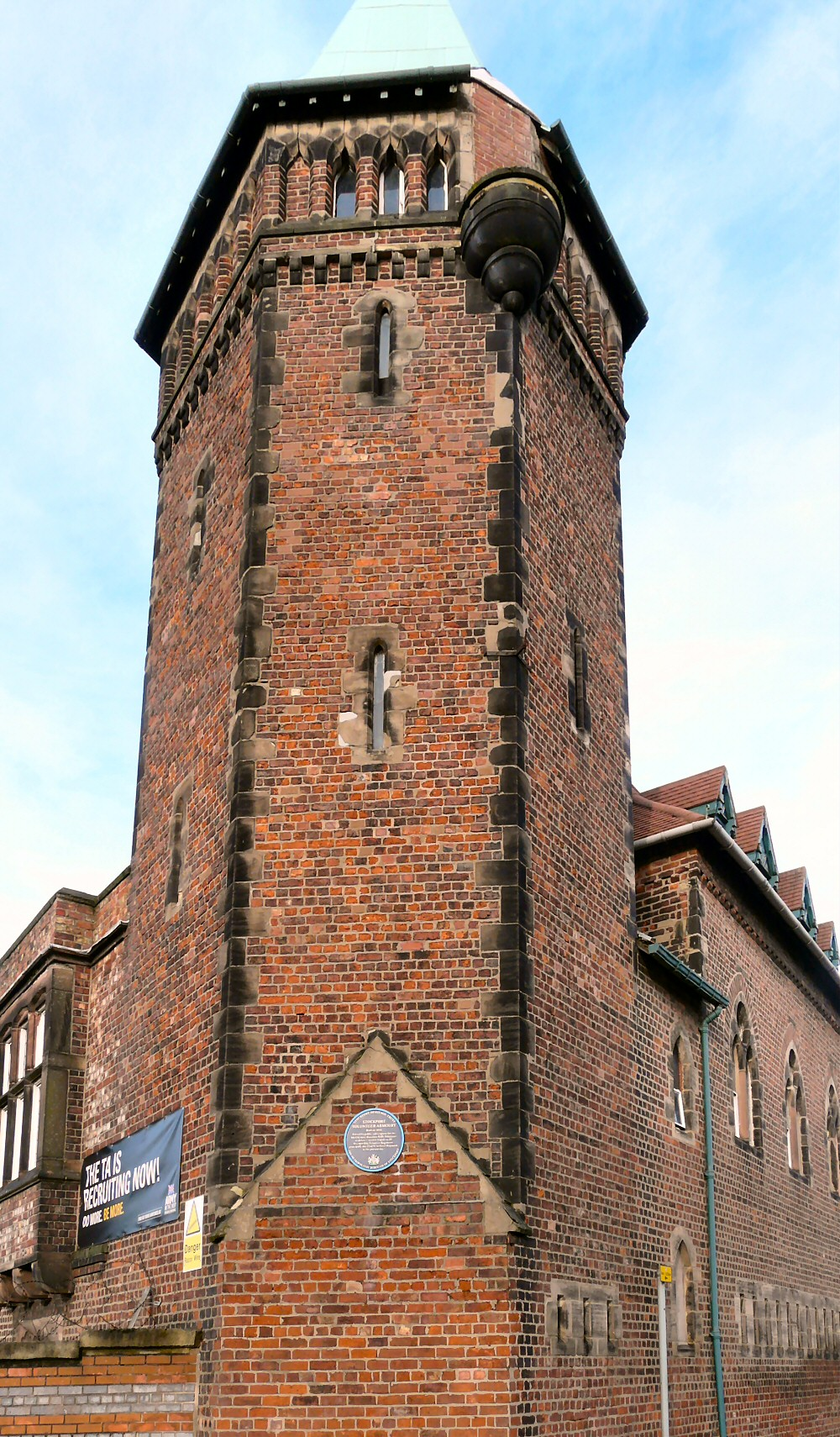
- The building in 2014

- Location in Greater Manchester

General information
- Status: Army Reserve Centre
- Type: Drill hall
- Location: Shaw Heath, Stockport, Greater Manchester, England
- Coordinates: 53.40266°N 2.16165°W
- Year built: 1862
- Owner: War Office

Listed Building – Grade II
- Official name: The Armoury of the Cheshire Regiment
- Designated: 10 March 1975
- Reference no.: 1067207

Stockport Armoury is a military installation in the Shaw Heath suburb of Stockport, Greater Manchester, England. It is a Grade II listed building.

== History ==
The building was designed by Henry Bowman as the headquarters of the 4th Administrative Battalion, Cheshire Rifle Volunteer Corps in 1862. The unit evolved to become the 4th Volunteer Battalion, the Cheshire Regiment in 1883 and the 6th Battalion, Cheshire Regiment in 1908. The battalion was mobilised at the drill hall in August 1914 before being deployed to the Western Front and then being disbanded in 1920.

After the war, a new 6th (Cheshire and Shropshire) Medium Brigade, the Royal Garrison Artillery, was formed at the Armoury from the Cheshire Brigade, Royal Field Artillery, incorporating the former 6th Bn Cheshire Regiment and the Shropshire Royal Horse Artillery. In 1921, the new unit was redesignated 60th (6th Cheshire and Shropshire) Medium Brigade, RGA. In the late 1930s, the unit was converted into 81st Heavy Anti-Aircraft Regiment, Royal Artillery, which saw service in the Blitz, in the Orkney and Shetland Defences, and in the Middle East during the Second World War. After the war it became 360th (Mobile) Heavy AA Regiment, but was amalgamated with other regiments in Manchester when Anti-Aircraft Command was disbanded in 1955.

"A" Company, the Mercian Volunteers was formed at the Armoury in 1967 and evolved to become the "A" Company, the 3rd (Volunteer) Battalion, The Cheshire Regiment in 1988 and Salerno Company, the Fire Support Battalion, The Cheshire Regiment in 1995. The presence at the Armoury was reduced to a mortar platoon of "B" (Cheshire) Company, The King's and Cheshire Regiment in 1999, of "A" (Cheshire) Company, The West Midlands Regiment in 2006 and of "A" (Cheshire) Company, 4th Battalion, The Mercian Regiment in 2007. The Armoury is still an active Army Reserve Centre.

== See also ==
- Listed buildings in Stockport
