= Cheshire Artillery Volunteers =

Cheshire Artillery Volunteers Cheshire Brigade, RFA 60th (6th Cheshire & Shropshire) Medium Brigade, RA 81st Heavy Anti-Aircraft Regiment, RA 360th Heavy Anti-Aircraft Regiment, RA
- Active: 30 December 1859 – 10 March 1955
- Country: United Kingdom
- Branch: Volunteer Force; Territorial Force; Territorial Army
- Type: Artillery Regiment
- Role: Garrison artillery Field artillery Medium artillery Air defence
- Part of: 53rd (Welsh) Division; 4 AA Division; Orkney & Shetland Defences; Middle East Forces; 59 AA Bde
- Garrison/HQ: Chester; Stockport Armoury
- Engagements: Sinai and Palestine Campaign; Home Defence; Middle East

The Cheshire Artillery Volunteers was a brigade of Volunteer artillery units raised in the county of Cheshire in the mid-19th century. Their successors served as field artillery in Palestine during World War I and as anti-aircraft (AA) gunners in the Middle East in World War II. They continued in the air defence role in the Territorial Army until 1955.

== Volunteer Force ==
The enthusiasm for the Volunteer movement following an invasion scare in 1859 saw the creation of many Volunteer Corps composed of part-time soldiers eager to supplement the Regular British Army in time of need. A number of Artillery Volunteer Corps (AVCs) were quickly formed in Cheshire, and in June 1860 they were brought together into the 1st Administrative Brigade of Cheshire Artillery Volunteer Corps with headquarters (HQ) at Chester and the following organisation:

- 1st (Birkenhead) Cheshire AVC (2 batteries), raised 30 December 1859 at Jackson & Brassey's Canada Works
- 2nd (Earl of Chester's) Cheshire AVC (1, later 2 batteries), raised in Chester 8 February 1860
- 3rd (Seacombe) Cheshire AVC (1 battery), raised 10 February 1860
- 4th (New Brighton) Cheshire AVC (1 battery), raised 15 February 1860
- 5th (Laird's Iron Works) Cheshire AVC (3 batteries), raised at Birkenhead 1 March 1860 with William Laird junior as Captain Commandant

The commanding officer (CO) of the admin brigade was Major, later Lieutenant-Colonel, Henry A. Gray.

By November 1863, the following units had also been included in the 1st Cheshire Admin Brigade:

- 1st Shropshire AVC
- 1st Staffordshire AVC
- 1st Worcestershire AVC – joined June 1865

These units left in 1866 to form the 1st Staffordshire Admin Brigade, but rejoined in August 1867. They left once more in 1869 to form the 1st Shropshire Admin Brigade.

In 1873, another group of AVCs from outside the county joined the 1st Cheshire Admin Brigade:

- 1st Anglesey AVC – from 1st Anglesey Admin Brigade; disbanded 1875
- 3rd Anglesey AVC – from 1st Anglesey Admin Brigade; renamed 2nd Carnarvonshire 1878
- 1st Carnarvonshire AVC – from 1st Anglesey Admin Brigade
- 1st Isle of Man AVC – disbanded 1875

The 1st and 5th Cheshire AVCs were dependent upon low-paid workers from Birkenhead ironworks, and, as the numbers who could remain with the Volunteers declined, these units were disbanded in 1873 and 1869 respectively. In 1866, the subtitle 'Earl of Chester's' was formally conferred on the 2nd Cheshire AVC (the Earldom of Chester is held by the Prince of Wales). When the Volunteers were consolidated in June 1880, the 1st Admin Brigade became the 2nd Cheshire AVC, taking the number of its senior surviving corps, but within a month this had been changed to 1st Cheshire and Carnarvonshire AVC, with HQ at Chester and the following organisation:

- Nos 1, 2 and 3 Companies at Chester – from 2nd Cheshire AVC'
- No 4 Company at New Brighton – from 4th Cheshire AVC
- No 5 Company at Seacombe – from 3rd Cheshire AVC
- Nos 6 and 7 Companies at Bangor – from 2nd Carnarvonshire AVC
- No 8 Company at Caernarfon – 'from 1st Carnarvonshire AVC

In 1886, the unit made an unsuccessful application for the subtitle 'Earl of Chester's' to be restored. In 1882, it was assigned to the Lancashire Division of the Royal Artillery, but when the divisional structure was reduced in 1889 it joined the Southern Division.

As well as manning fixed coast defence artillery, some of the early Artillery Volunteers manned semi-mobile 'position batteries' of smooth-bore field guns pulled by agricultural horses. But the War Office refused to pay for the upkeep of field guns for Volunteers and they had largely died out in the 1870s. In 1888, the 'position artillery' concept was revived and some Volunteer companies were reorganised as position batteries to work alongside the Volunteer infantry brigades. On 14 July 1892, the 1st Cheshire & Carnarvon Volunteer Artillery were reorganised as 1 position (later 'heavy') battery and 7 garrison companies:

On 1 June 1899, all the Volunteer artillery units became part of the Royal Garrison Artillery (RGA). With the abolition of the RA's divisional organisation on 1 January 1902, the unit became the 1st Cheshire and Carnarvonshire RGA (Volunteers). The HQ was at County Buildings, Old Prison Yard, Shipgate Street, Chester. In 1904, the Carnavonshire companies were separated to form their own 1st Carnarvonshire RGA (V).

== Territorial Force ==
When the Volunteers were subsumed into the new Territorial Force (TF) under the Haldane Reforms of 1908, part of the 1st Cheshire RGA (V) formed Nos. 5 and 6 Companies of the Lancashire & Cheshire RGA, a defended ports unit, while the remainder transferred to the Royal Field Artillery (RFA) with the following organisation:

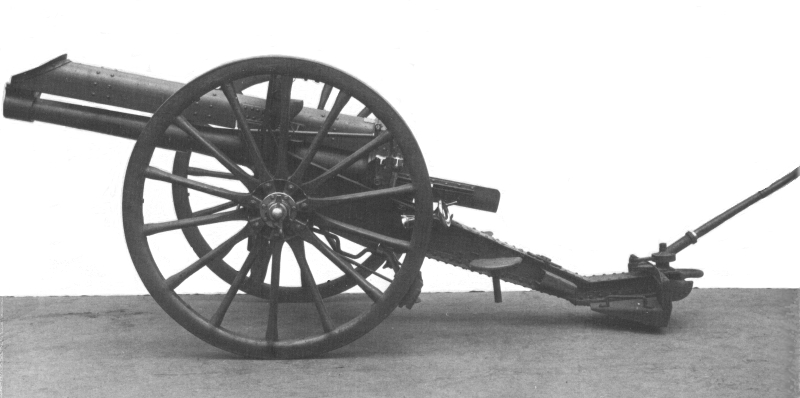
15-pounder gun, issued to the Territorial Force

III Welsh Brigade, RFA

- HQ at Chester
- 1st Cheshire Battery
- 2nd Cheshire Battery
- 3rd Flintshire Battery
- 3rd Welsh Ammunition Column

The unit was the third field artillery brigade in the TF's Welsh Division. In 1912, the Flintshire battery was disbanded and replaced by a 3rd Cheshire Bty at Wistaston Road, Crewe. In 1913, the unit was redesignated Cheshire Brigade, RFA, when the ammunition column was similarly redesignated. The batteries were each issued with four 15-pounder guns.

== World War I ==
=== Mobilisation ===
After the order to mobilise was received on 4 August 1914, the units of the Welsh Division assembled at their drill halls. The Cheshire Brigade mobilised at Shiplake Street under the command of Lt-Col Frederick Bonnalie, TD, who had been CO since 1906.

By 11 August, the units had completed their concentration and TF members were invited to volunteer for Overseas Service. Four days later, the War Office issued instructions to separate those men who had signed up for Home Service only, and form these into reserve units. Then, on 31 August, the formation of a reserve or 2nd Line unit was authorised for each 1st Line unit where 60 per cent or more of the men had volunteered for Overseas Service. The titles of these 2nd Line units would be the same as the original, but distinguished by a '2/' prefix. In this way, duplicate batteries, brigades and divisions were created, mirroring those TF formations being sent overseas.

=== 1/1st Cheshire Brigade, RFA ===
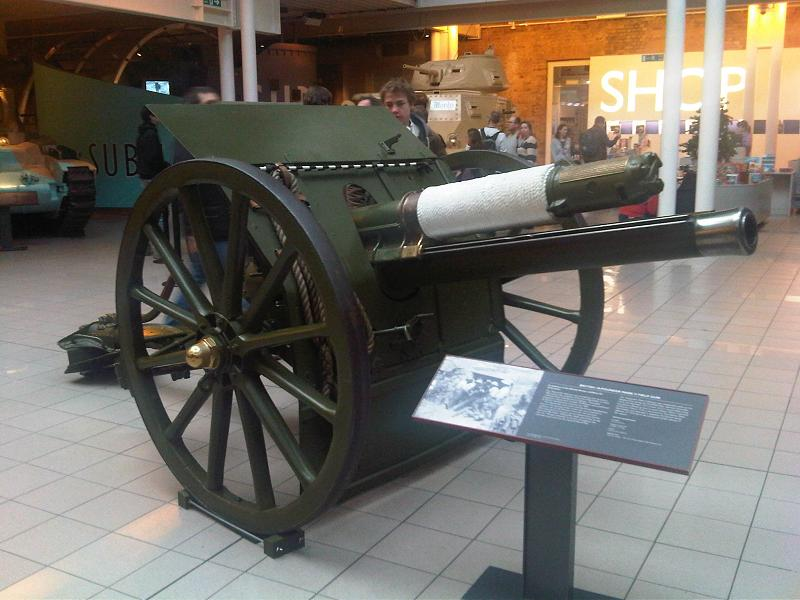
18-pounder preserved at the Imperial War Museum

At the end of August, the Welsh Division concentrated at Northampton to continue its training. On 18 November, the division was warned for garrison duty in India, but this was cancelled and in December it moved to Cambridge, then to Bedford in May 1915. In July, the infantry of the division (now renamed the 53rd (Welsh) Division) embarked for service at Gallipoli, but the divisional artillery remained at Bedford. In October, the batteries were re-armed with modern 18-pounder guns and, on 8 November, they handed over their obsolescent 15-pounders to the 2nd Line, which had just arrived at Bedford.

53rd (Welsh) Divisional Artillery was now ordered to France to join the British Expeditionary Force (BEF) on the Western Front. It embarked on 20 November and had concentrated at Pont-Remy by 25 November, from where parties were sent to various divisional artilleries for instruction in front line duties.

Meanwhile, after suffering appalling casualties at Gallipoli, 53rd (Welsh) Division had been withdrawn to Egypt to refit. On 30 January 1916, the divisional artillery was ordered to rejoin the rest of the division. The batteries entrained at Pont-Remy, embarked at Marseille on 3 February and disembarked at Alexandria on 11 February. By 22 February, the artillery had rejoined the division at Beni Salama. For the rest of the year the recuperating division was stationed in the Suez Canal defences.

As senior brigade commanding officer, Lt-Col Bonnalie frequently acted as Commander, Royal Artillery (CRA), for 53rd (W) Division in 1915–16.

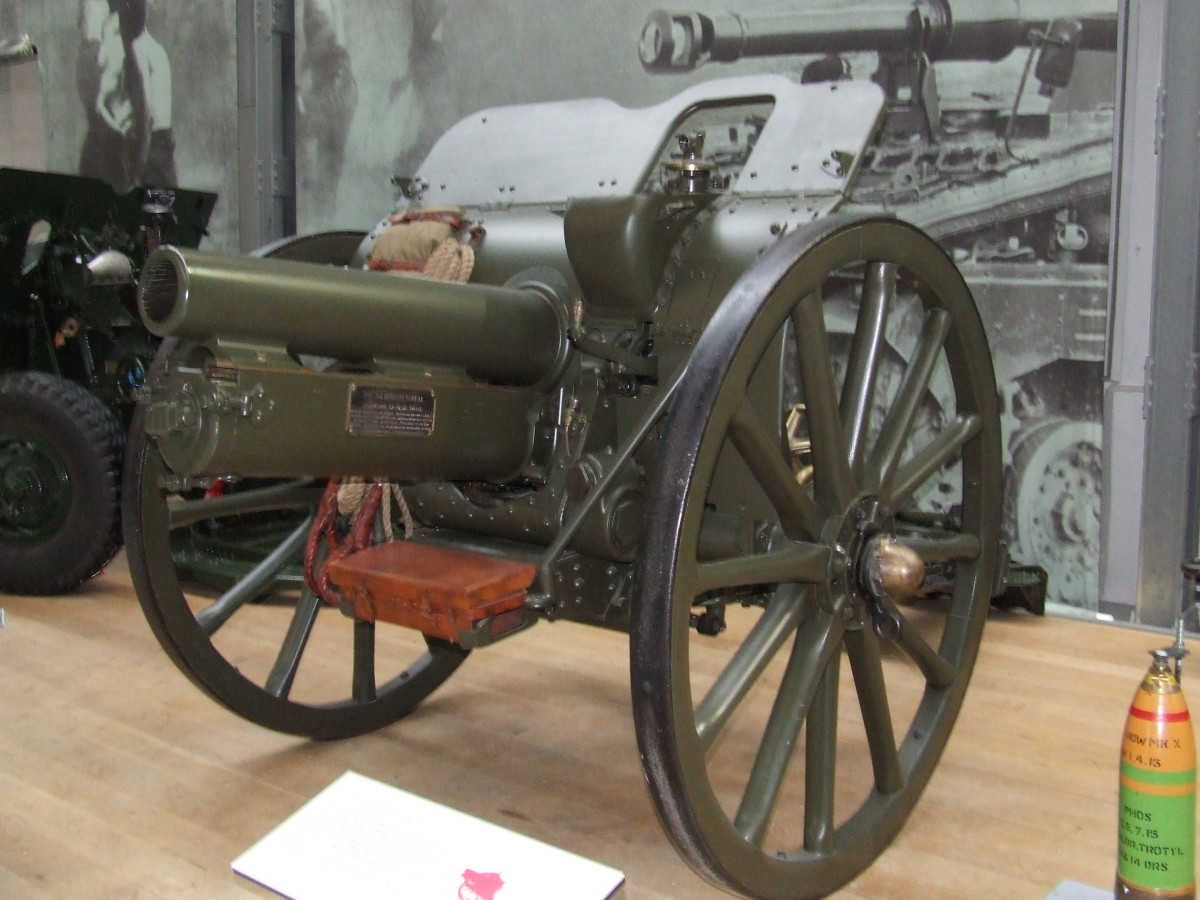
4.5-inch howitzer preserved at the Royal Artillery Museum

In May 1916, the TF field brigades were numbered, the Cheshire being designated CCLXVII (267) Brigade, RFA, and the batteries became A, B and C. Then, on 25 December 1916, the divisional artillery was reorganised: A Bty of CCLXVII Bde was broken up between B and C Btys (to make them up to six guns each) and they were redesignated A and B; A (H) Bty, equipped with four 4.5-inch howitzers, joined from CCLXV (H) Bde (the old 1st Welsh (Howitzer) Brigade, which was being broken up) and became C (H) Bty, and half of the 1st Welsh Brigade Ammunition Column (BAC) also joined. Finally, CCLXVII Bde took the now-vacant number of the 1st Welsh as CCLXV (265) Brigade, RFA, with the following organisation:

- A Bty (6 x 18-pounders) – from 2nd Cheshire Bty + half 1st Cheshire Bty'
- B Bty (6 x 18-pounders) – from 3rd Cheshire Bty + half 1st Cheshire Bty'
- C (H) Bty (4 x 4.5-inch howitzers) – from 1st Glamorgan Bty
- CCLXV BAC – from Cheshire BAC + half 1st Welsh BAC

However, 53rd (W) Divisional Ammunition Column had remained in France, and was reformed in Egypt by abolishing the BACs.

==== Palestine ====
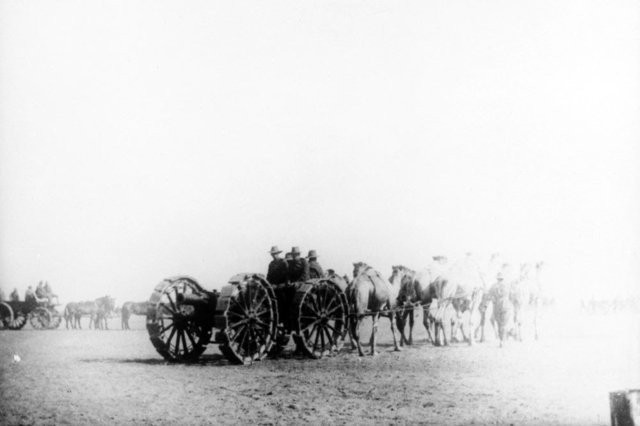
4.5-inch Howitzer with 'ped-rails' (sand tyres) around wheels, as used in crossing Sinai

Early in 1917, the Egyptian Expeditionary Force launched the Sinai and Palestine Campaign by crossing the Sinai desert and advancing against Turkish forces at Gaza City. The First Battle of Gaza began during the night of 25/26 March when 53rd (W) Division advanced 12 miles (19 km) to cross the Wadi Ghuzzeh, with CCLXV Bde following 160th Infantry Brigade. Despite the darkness and morning fog, the infantry were in position by 08.30 and at 10.20 CCLXV Bde had two of its batteries in position and the third moving up. However, the attack orders were late reaching the infantry, and the bombardment did not begin until 12.00, and communication was poor. The artillery was supposed to be under divisional control, but heard nothing, and had to work through the infantry brigade HQs, who complained that the Forward Observation Officers (FOOs) could not be found. There was a shortage of telephone cable, and the FOO for B/CCLXV Bty reported that having followed the advancing 2/10th Battalion Middlesex Regiment and called down fire on 'The Labyrinth', he came to the end of his cable and although he went forward with the infantry he had trouble passing message back to his signaller stationed at the cable's end. Meanwhile, the battery had to shift its position six times during the day, laboriously crossing numerous wadis, but still fired 1511 rounds. The division's attack went well, but the artillery fire was too weak until reinforcements arrived from 54th (East Anglian) Division. The gunners were then able to subdue enemy machine guns on Clay Hill, while 160th Bde captured The Labyrinth. The division took all its objectives and its troops were in the eastern streets of Gaza when the attack was stopped for lack of water. Although 53rd (W) Division consolidated its position, it was withdrawn the following day.

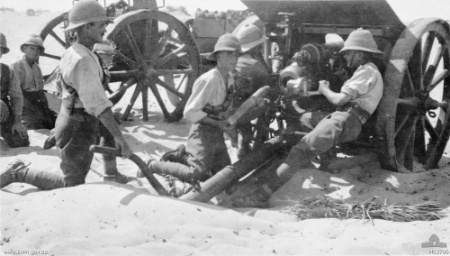
18-pounder gun in Sinai

For the Second Battle of Gaza, beginning on 17 April, 53rd (W) Division's role was to advance up the coast across Wadi Ghuzzeh, and then attack Gaza after an artillery bombardment. The bombardment was begun by the heavy artillery and warships offshore, then the 4.5-inch howitzers began firing gas shells against Turkish batteries. At 07.20, 10 minutes before Zero, the 18-pounders began engaging the objectives. The infantry attacked punctually at 07.30 and 53rd (W) Division captured Samson's Ridge. However, it could not push on because the neighbouring division was badly held up and the artillery fire was too weak. Casualties had been high and gains minimal, and the EEF dug in for a summer of trench warfare.

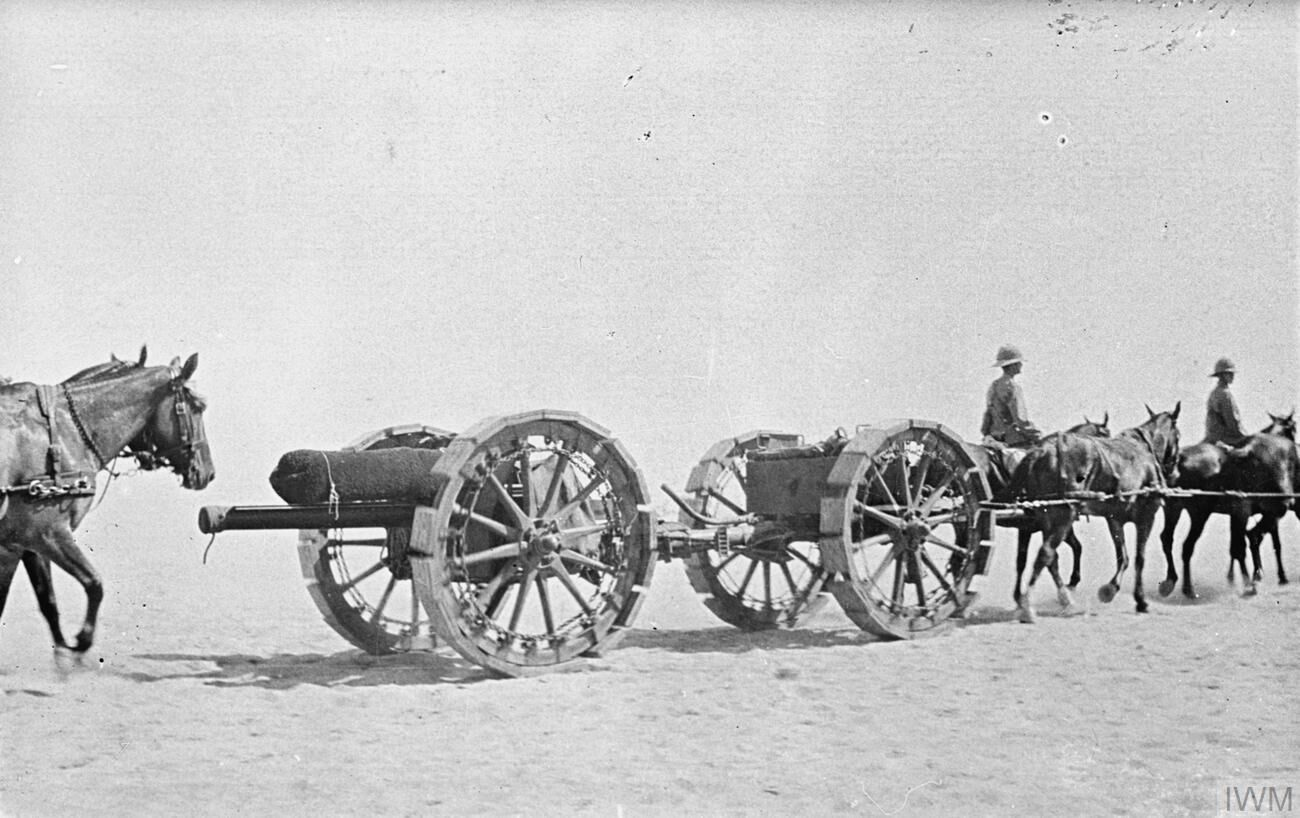
18-pounder with sand wheels

Although the War Office was unable to provide more divisions for the EEF, it could send guns: 53rd (W) Division's batteries were temporarily brought up to a strength of eight rather than six guns, until further troops arrived. The reorganised EEF renewed its offensive (the Third Battle of Gaza) on 27 October. XX Corps, including 53rd (W) Divisional artillery, moved into position during the night of 30/31 October to capture Beersheba, and the bombardment began at 05.55. After a pause at 07.00 to let the dust settle and determine the effect, the guns reopened. Infantry parties advanced to within 30 yards (27 m) of the barrage to finish cutting the barbed wire. They then rushed Point 1069 and the 18-pounder batteries began to move up to more advanced positions. Beersheba had fallen to the Desert Column and XX Corps could bivouack on the objective. On 3 November 53rd (W) Division was ordered to advance to the Tel es Sheria road. The left column consisted of 159th (Cheshire) Brigade and CCLXV Bde under Lt-Col James Walker. It was a difficult march over broken country in hot weather and there were several sharp actions with enemy detachments, though most casualties came from enemy shellfire. Over following days 53rd (W) Division kept up pressure on the enemy in the hills so that the EEF could roll up the main trench lines (the Battle of Hareira and Sheria). Then on 6 November the division assaulted the Khuweilfe position supported by an intense bombardment by all its own guns and a heavy battery. During the night CCLXV Bde (less one battery) had been brought round from the left of the division to the right to reinforce the artillery support for 158th Bde, which was all put under the command of Lt-Col Walker. The night move was extremely difficult, the rough country forcing each gun had to be double-teamed with horses and manhandled as well. There was no time to reconnoitre battery positions or register the guns: the guns were simply dragged up the hill and lined up alongside batteries that had already registered. After confused fighting the position was held, with the support of the divisional artillery breaking up Turkish counter-attacks. After the battle the gunners were allowed up Khuweife to see what they had achieved.

After breaking through the Gaza positions, the EEF pressed on to Jerusalem in appalling weather. The city was to be captured by XX Corps after a rapid advance by a flying column known as 'Mott's Detachment' that included 53rd (W) Division. The batteries of CCLXV and CCLXVI Bdes moved up in bounds, covering the flanks of the advance. At 07.00 on 7 December, as the preliminary attacks began, a few ranging shots by C Bty of CCLXV Bde scattered a body of enemy cavalry at Sherife, a position that would have been troublesome if the Turks had held it. Jerusalem fell the following day, but there was still heavy fighting to the end of the year as the Turks threw in counter-attacks. On 21 December, 160th Bde put in a full-scale attack on El Zamby and White Hill to improve its position, advancing behind a lifting barrage put down by CCVXV and CCLXVI Bdes from 05.15. When the attack was held up the fireplan was rearranged with an 18-pounder concentration on El Zamby from 07.20 to 07.40, when 2/4th Battalion Queen's Regiment assaulted again. The position was held against several Turkish counter-attacks, with heavy ammunition expenditure by the gunners.

XX Corps renewed its advance in March 1918, 53rd(W) Division pushing forward a little on 2 March, then again on 6 March against only slight opposition, before the whole Corps advanced on 8 March. 53rd (W) Division's main objective was the hill of Tell 'Asur, and it was supported by plentiful artillery as well as its own brigades. The peak was taken, lost, and retaken, followed by four more Turkish counter-attacks. That night, the division also took Chipp Hill, which had defied the neighbouring division during daylight, but on 10 March found the wadi in front too steep to climb, only passing over it during darkness on 12 March. The new line was held through the summer months.

In the summer of 1918, the 53rd Division was 'Indianised', with three-quarters of the infantry battalions replaced by others drawn from the British Indian Army, but this did not affect the divisional artillery, which retained its composition to the end of the war.

At the climactic Battle of Megiddo, 53rd (W) Division attacked late on the first day (18 September), after a 20-minute bombardment. The sound of the infantry's approach march had previously been drowned by slow shellfire on Keen's Hill. The gunners then fired smoke shells to guide the infantry's advance in the moonlight. One Turkish position held out, and a new attack was arranged for 19 November, with Lt-Col Walker of CCLXV Bde arranging the artillery support. During the afternoon a party of Turks was found eating lunch in the open, and every field gun in range was called in to destroy them. When the attack went in at 19.00 it was completely successful, the main enemy position was taken and the guns could move forward with A/CCLXV Bty in the lead. The pressure was kept up on 20 September, and when 158th Bde advanced at 23.00 it found the Turks had retired, and continued advancing through the night until 05.30 on 21 September when it found the road blocked. The roads were very bad, and the Royal Engineers struggled to make a path for the guns, but the artillery closed up behind 158th Bde and watered their horses. At dawn a Turkish column was seen taking up position on the El Tuwanik ridge: this magnificent target was out of range of the guns, even if the horse teams could have been brought up to push further forward. The advance continued at 08.30 and by 15.00 the infantry had taken El Tuwanik. By the end of the next day the Turkish army was shattered, and a general advance was ordered.

After the battle the division was withdrawn to Alexandria before the Armistice of Mudros came into effect on 31 October. Demobilisation began on 20 December and was completed in June 1919. CCLXV Brigade was placed in suspended animation.

=== 2/1st Cheshire Brigade, RFA ===
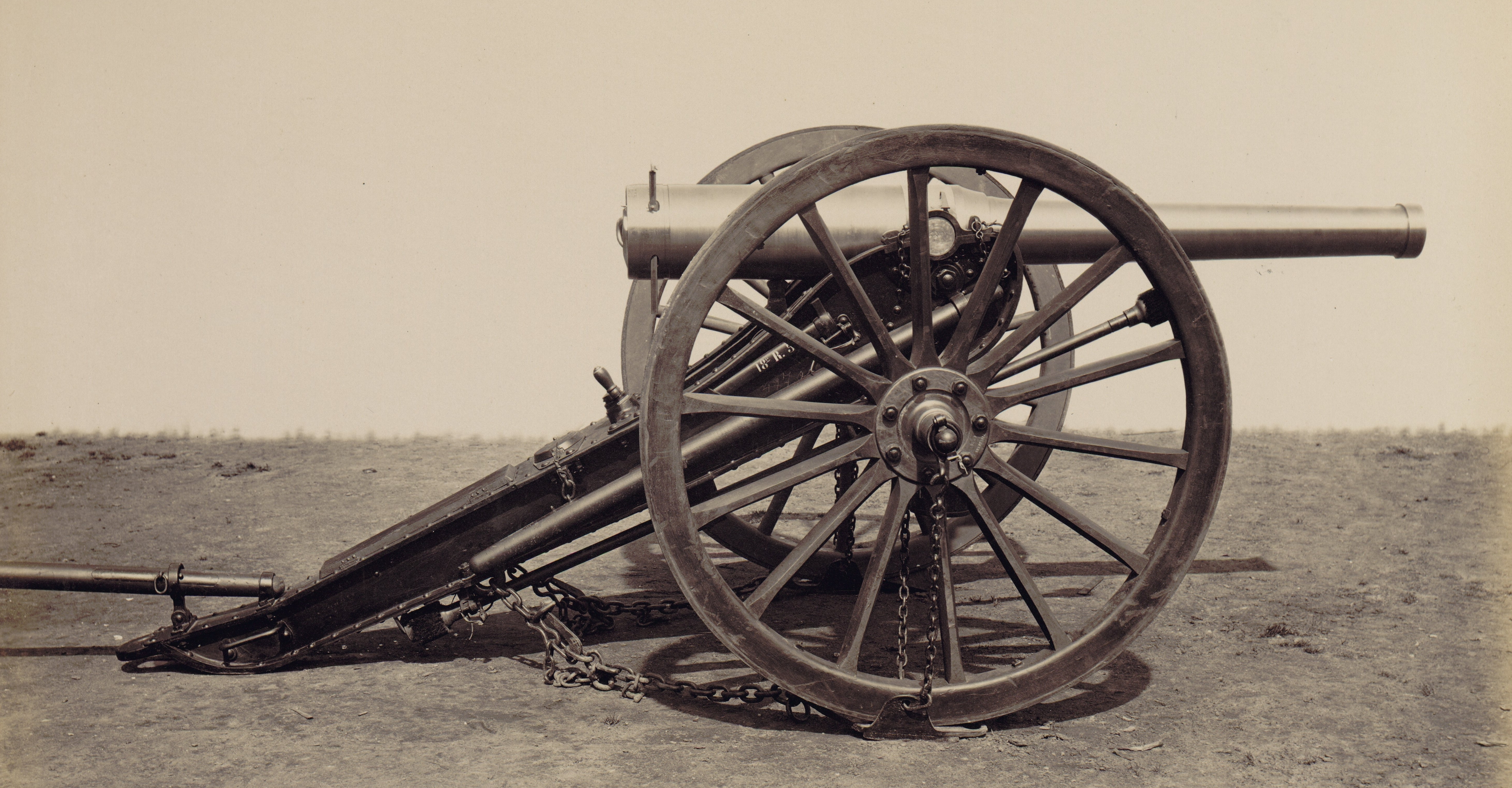
French De Bange 90 mm gun

Although formation of the 2nd Line units began in September 1914, the 2nd Welsh Division (68th (2nd Welsh) Division from August 1915) did not concentrate at Northampton until April 1915, moving in the summer to replace the 53rd (Welsh) Division at Bedford. Training of the units was made difficult by the lack of arms and equipment, and the requirement to provide drafts to the 1st Line overseas. At the end of May, 2/1st Cheshire Brigade sent two officers and 106 other ranks to help form the 53rd Divisional Ammunition Column. In June, the first saddlery and horses began to arrive, but no guns until August, when the brigade received four French De Bange 90 mm guns. Some ammunition wagons arrived in September, and eight more 90 mm guns in October. Training began to speed up, with the 90 mm guns standing in for 15-pounders. In November, they were handed in, and the brigade moved to Bedford to take over the 15-pounders from the 1st Line. In December 1915, these, in turn, were replaced by modern 18-pounders.

68th (2nd Welsh) Division had been assigned a role in Home Defence in November when it joined First Army (Home Forces) in Central Force, with its units quartered across Eastern England. In May 1916, the brigade was numbered CCCXLII (342nd) Brigade and the batteries became A, B and C. Later, A (H) Bty from CCCXL (2/I Welsh) (Howitzer) Bde joined and became D (H) Bty. In May 1917, the division transferred to Northern Army (Home Forces), and remained in Norfolk and Suffolk until the end of the war.

CCCXLII Brigade was disbanded in 1919.

== Interwar ==
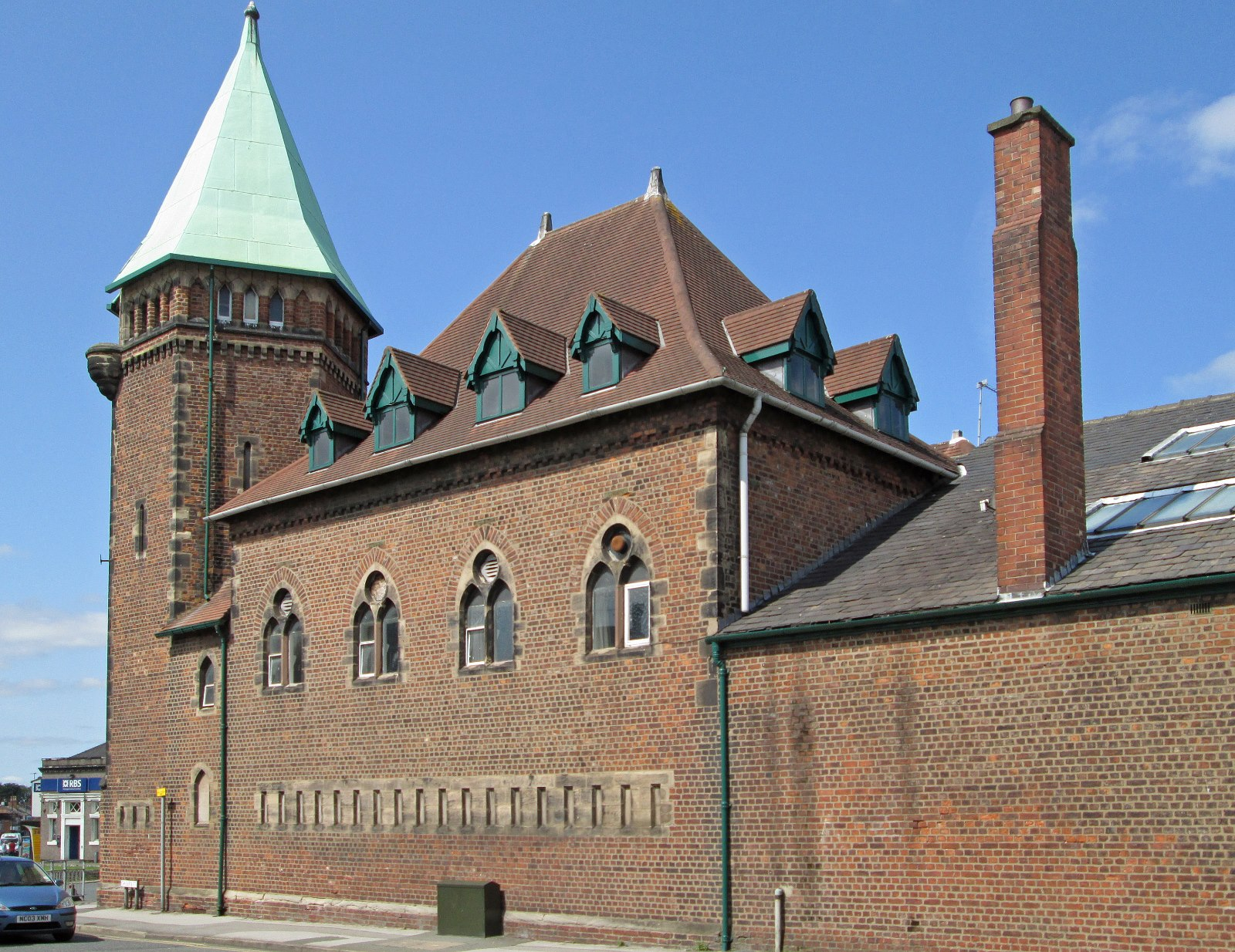
Stockport Armoury today

After the war the Cheshire Brigade was reconstituted in 1920, incorporating the former 6th Battalion, Cheshire Regiment, at Stockport and the Shropshire Royal Horse Artillery at Shrewsbury to form the 6th (Cheshire and Shropshire) Medium Brigade, RGA. The TF was reorganised as the Territorial Army (TA) in 1921, and the unit was redesignated as 60th (6th Cheshire and Shropshire) Medium Brigade, RGA (RA from 1924 when the RGA was subsumed into the Royal Artillery), with the following organisation:

- HQ at The Armoury, Stockport
- 237 (Cheshire) Med Bty at Stockport
- 238 (Cheshire) Med Bty (Howitzer) at Stockport
- 239 (Cheshire) Med Bty (Howitzer) at Walmsley Street, Stalybridge
- 240 (Shropshire) Medium Bty (Howitzer) at Coleham, Shrewsbury

The unit was part of 'Army Troops' in the 42nd (East Lancashire) Divisional Area. 240 (Shropshire) Med Bty gained the subtitle '(Shropshire RHA)' in 1927. The 1st Cheshire RGA Cadet Corps was affiliated with the brigade.

=== 81st Anti-Aircraft Brigade, RA ===
In the late 1930s, the need for improved anti-aircraft (AA) defences for Britain's cities became apparent, and a programme of converting existing TA units was pushed forward. In 1938, the Shropshire RHA battery was transferred to 51st (Midland) Medium Regiment while the Cheshire batteries reorganised as 81st Anti-Aircraft Regiment:

- Regimental HQ at Stockport
- 253 (Cheshire) AA Bty at Stockport
- 254 (Cheshire) AA Bty at Stockport
- 255 (Cheshire) AA Bty at Stalybridge

== World War II ==
=== Mobilisation ===
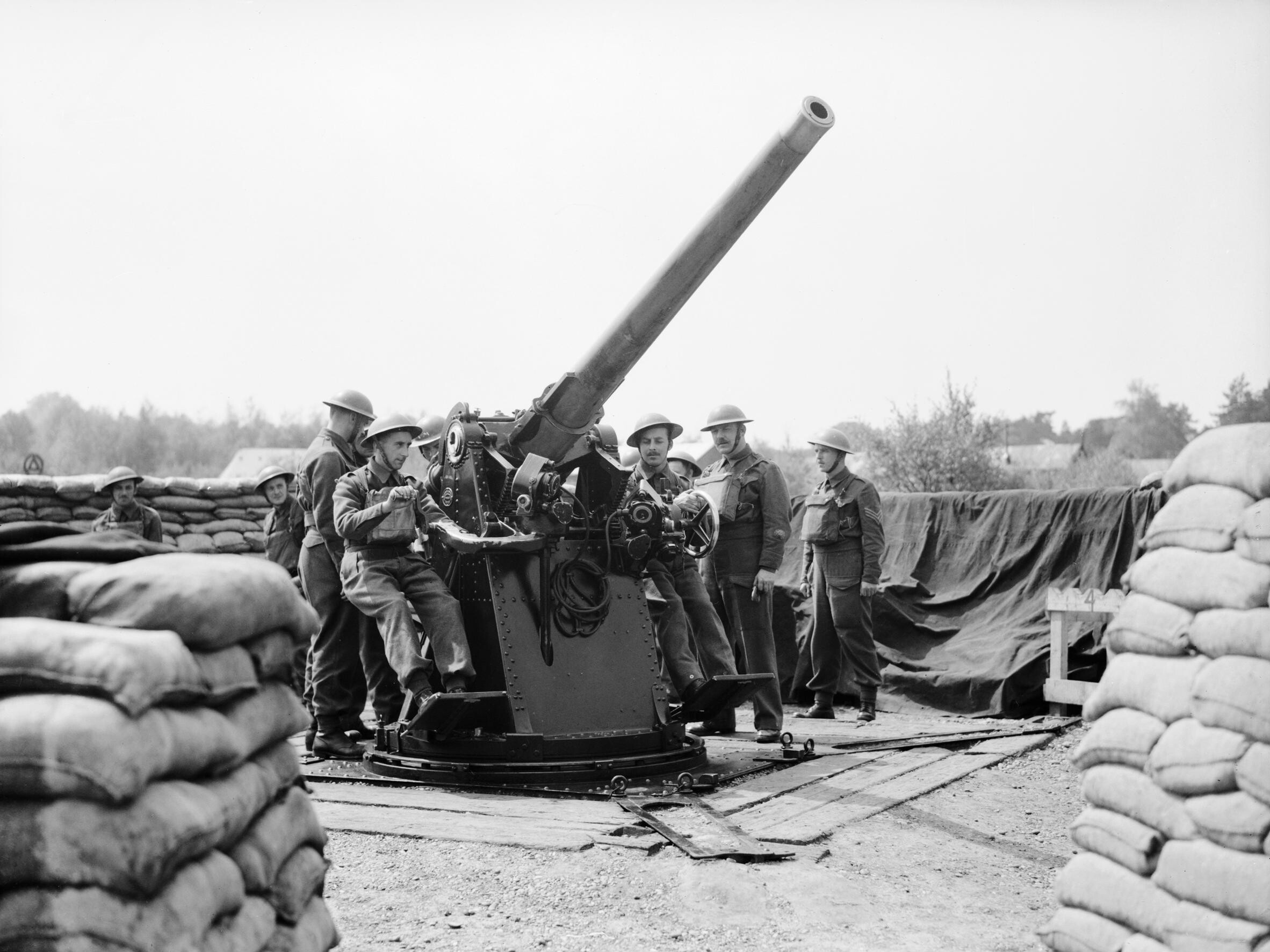
3-inch HAA gun of AA Command, 1940

The TA's AA units were mobilised on 23 September 1938 during the Munich Crisis, with units manning their emergency positions within 24 hours, even though many did not yet have their full complement of men or equipment. The emergency lasted three weeks, and they were stood down on 13 October. In February 1939 the existing AA defences came under the control of a new Anti-Aircraft Command. In June a partial mobilisation of TA units was begun in a process known as 'couverture', whereby each AA unit did a month's tour of duty in rotation to man selected AA and searchlight positions. On 24 August, ahead of the declaration of war, AA Command was fully mobilised at its war stations.

=== Phoney War ===
4 AA Division's insignia

81st AA Regiment came under the command of 44th Anti-Aircraft Brigade based at Manchester and forming part of 4th Anti-Aircraft Division. The regiment initially manned two heavy AA battery sites equipped with 3-inch guns (253 AA Bty at Site J with two, 254 AA Bty at Site L with four) and also deployed 15 Lewis guns as light AA cover for the Metropolitan-Vickers factory at Trafford Park.

By early November, 254 AA Bty was manning 32 Lewis guns at Metropolitan-Vickers, 253 AA Bty was at the Armoury at Stockport, and 255 AA Bty was detached to 34 (South Midland) AA Bde at Coventry. Despite alarms and occasional overflights by presumed enemy aircraft, there was no action during this Phoney War period.

=== Orkney & Shetland Defences ===
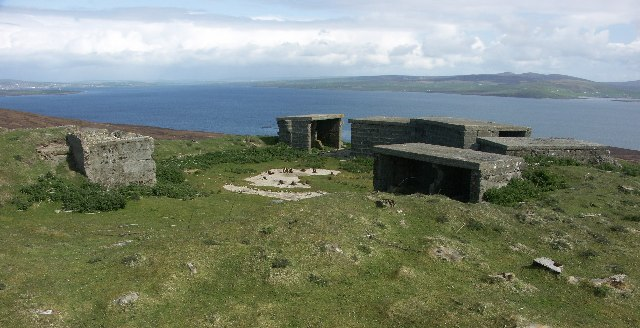
Remains of an HAA emplacement at Lyrawa Hill, Orkney

In June 1940, the Royal Artillery's AA Regiments were redesignated Heavy AA (HAA) to distinguish them from the new Light AA (LAA) regiments being formed. 81st HAA Regiment had left 44 AA Bde by now, and gone to the Orkneys to join Orkey and Shetland Defences (OSDEF) protecting the Royal Navy anchorage at Scapa Flow. As well as its own batteries, the regiment had 226 (Caithness and Orkney) HAA Bty under its command while the rest of the battery's parent regiment (101st HAA Rgt) was stationed in Shetland.

The regiment sent a cadre of experienced officers and men to 211th HAA Training Rgt at Oswestry where they provided the basis for 416 HAA Bty formed on 16 January 1941. This new battery joined the regiment on 10 April 1941. Later the regiment supplied another cadre to 211th HAA Training Rgt, which formed 461 HAA Bty on 10 July 1941; once trained this battery joined a newly-formed 134th HAA Rgt. A further cadre went to form 547 (Mixed) HAA Bty at 206th HAA Training Rgt, Arborfield, on 19 March 1942; this joined 135th (Mixed) HAA Rgt. ('Mixed' units were those into which women from the Auxiliary Territorial Service were integrated.)

=== Middle East ===
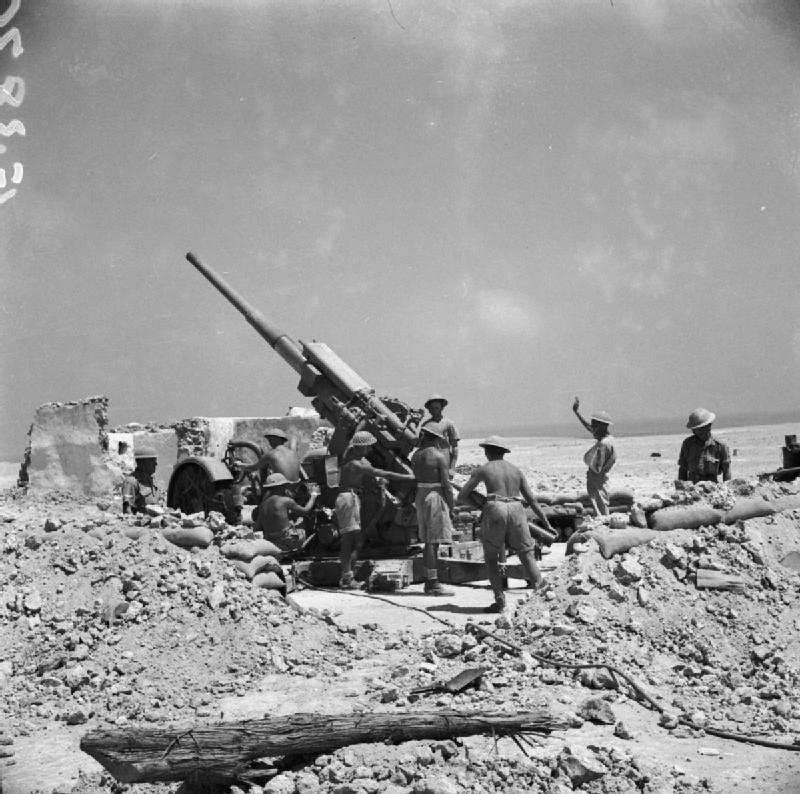
3.7-inch HAA gun in North Africa

81st HAA Regiment remained in OSDEF until June 1941. It returned to 44 AA Bde at Manchester, but was transferred to a new 70 AA Bde within 4 AA Division during the summer. As the flow of new AA units from the training centres continued, experienced units began to be prepared for overseas service, and 81st HAA was one of these. The regiment left 70 AA Bde and AA Command in April 1942, coming under War Office control preparatory to embarking in June. 416 HAA Battery left on 10 July 1942 and joined 115th HAA Rgt.

The regiment was part of a steady flow of AA reinforcements for Middle East Forces in the months before the Second Battle of El Alamein. The regiment with 24 x 3.7-inch guns joined a newly-arrived 21 AA Bde in defending the vital bases of Cairo, Port Said, Suez and the Suez Canal. It remained on this duty until June 1944. By then, the air threat to the Middle East bases had diminished and AA manpower was bring diverted to other tasks. 21 AA Brigade and 81st HAA Rgt were concentrated pending disbandment

The regiment was placed in suspended animation on 30 August 1944.

== Postwar ==
When the TA was reconstituted on 1 January 1947, the regiment was reformed as 360th (Mobile) Heavy Anti-Aircraft Regiment. It formed part of 59 AA Bde (the prewar 33 (Western) AA Bde) at Liverpool.

AA Command was disbanded on 10 March 1955, and there were wholesale mergers among TA AA units. 360th HAA Regiment was amalgamated with 310th (Manchester), 465th (Manchester), 574th (7th Bn Lancashire Fusiliers) and 606th (East Lancashire) HAA Rgts to form a new 314th HAA Rgt with its HQ at Manchester. 360th HAA Regiment formed R (Stockport) Bty in the new regiment.

On 1 May 1961, most of 314 Rgt merged into 252 (Manchester Artillery) Field Rgt, with R (Stockport) Bty continuing as R Bty in that regiment. When the TA was reduced into the Territorial and Army Volunteer Reserve in 1967, 252 Fd Rgt formed 209 (The Manchester Artillery) Light Air Defence Bty in 103 (Lancashire Artillery Volunteers) Light AD Rgt, ending the Cheshire lineage.

== Honorary Colonels ==
The following served as Honorary Colonel of the unit:

- Henry A. Gray, former CO, appointed 3 May 1876
- E. Evans-Lloyd, VD, former CO, appointed 8 July 1886
- H.T. Brown, VD, former CO, appointed 25 July 1900
- Wilford N. Lloyd, MVO, former CO, appointed 14 July 1906
- G.B. Heywood, appointed 5 April 1922
- Sir Geoffrey Christie-Miller, DSO, MC, TD, appointed 8 June 1932

== Memorial ==
In the north cloister of Chester Cathedral there are a memorial window and roll of honour to the men of the Cheshire Brigade, RFA, who died in World War I.

== Sources ==
- Maj A.F. Becke,History of the Great War: Order of Battle of Divisions, Part 2a: The Territorial Force Mounted Divisions and the 1st-Line Territorial Force Divisions (42–56), London: HM Stationery Office, 1935/Uckfield: Naval & Military Press, 2007, ISBN 1-847347-39-8.
- Maj A.F. Becke,History of the Great War: Order of Battle of Divisions, Part 2b: The 2nd-Line Territorial Force Divisions (57th–69th), with the Home-Service Divisions (71st–73rd) and 74th and 75th Divisions, London: HM Stationery Office, 1937/Uckfield: Naval & Military Press, 2007, ISBN 1-847347-39-8.
- Ian F.W. Beckett, Riflemen Form: A Study of the Rifle Volunteer Movement 1859–1908, Aldershot: Ogilby Trusts, 1982, ISBN 0 85936 271 X.
- Col John K. Dunlop, The Development of the British Army 1899–1914, London: Methuen, 1938.
- Capt Cyril Falls, History of the Great War: Military Operations, Egypt and Palestine, Vol II, From June 1917 to the End of the War, London: HM Stationery Office, 1930/Imperial War Museum and Naval & Military Press, 2013, ISBN 1-84574951-0.
- Gen Sir Martin Farndale, History of the Royal Regiment of Artillery: The Forgotten Fronts and the Home Base 1914–18, Woolwich: Royal Artillery Institution, 1988, ISBN 1-870114-05-1.
- Gen Sir Martin Farndale, History of the Royal Regiment of Artillery: The Years of Defeat: Europe and North Africa, 1939–1941, Woolwich: Royal Artillery Institution, 1988/London: Brasseys, 1996, ISBN 1-85753-080-2.
- J.B.M. Frederick, Lineage Book of British Land Forces 1660–1978, Vol II, Wakefield, Microform Academic, 1984, ISBN 1-85117-009-X.
- Norman E.H. Litchfield, The Territorial Artillery 1908–1988 (Their Lineage, Uniforms and Badges), Nottingham: Sherwood Press, 1992, ISBN 0-9508205-2-0.
- Norman Litchfield & Ray Westlake, The Volunteer Artillery 1859–1908 (Their Lineage, Uniforms and Badges), Nottingham: Sherwood Press, 1982, ISBN 0-9508205-0-4.
- Lt-Gen Sir George MacMunn & Capt Cyril Falls, History of the Great War: Military Operations, Egypt and Palestine, Vol I, From the Outbreak of War with Germany to June 1917, London: HM Stationery Office, 1928/Imperial War Museum and Battery Press, 1992, ISBN 1-870423-26-7.
- Brig N.W. Routledge, History of the Royal Regiment of Artillery: Anti-Aircraft Artillery 1914–55, London: Royal Artillery Institution/Brassey's, 1994, ISBN 1-85753-099-3
- Edward M. Spiers, The Army and Society 1815–1914, London: Longmans, 1980, ISBN 0-582-48565-7.
- Titles and Designations of Formations and Units of the Territorial Army, London: War Office, 7 November 1927 (RA sections also summarised in Litchfield, Appendix IV).
- Maj C.H. Dudley Ward, History of the 53rd (Welsh) Division (T.F.) 1914–1918, Cardiff: Western Mail, 1927/Uckfield: Naval & Military, 2004, ISBN 978-1-845740-50-4.

=== External sources ===
- Mark Conrad, The British Army, 1914 (archive site)
- British Army units from 1945 on
- The Drill Hall Project
- Imperial War Museum, War Memorials Register
- The Long, Long Trail
- Orders of Battle at Patriot Files
- The Regimental Warpath 1914–1918 (archive site)
- Royal Artillery 1939–1945
- Shropshire Regimental Museum Archived 15 March 2020 at the Wayback Machine
- Graham Watson, The Territorial Army 1947
