= XVII Corps (United Kingdom) =

- XVII Corps formation badge.
- Active: First World War
- Country: United Kingdom
- Branch: British Army
- Type: Field corps
- Part of: Third Army
- Engagements: First World War: Arras Offensive; Battle of the Somme 1918; Second Battle of Arras 1918; Battles of the Hindenburg Line; Final Advance in Picardy

The British XVII Corps was a British infantry corps during the First World War.

== History ==
British XVII Corps was formed in France in January 1916 under Lieutenant General Julian Byng. In April 1917 the Corps attacked to the east of Arras near the River Scarpe but became bogged down in rain and snow. However, the Corps held the line at Arras, continued to hold it through into 1918 and then broke the main Hindenburg Line at its strongest point in September 1918.

== General Officers Commanding ==
Commanders included:

- 9 December 1915 – 12 February 1916 Lieutenant-General Sir Charles Anderson
- 12–27 February 1916 Major-General Edward Montagu-Stuart-Wortley (acting)
- 27 February – 25 May 1916 Lieutenant-General Julian Byng
- 25 May 1916 – November 1918 Lieutenant-General Sir Charles Fergusson
