= Third Army (United Kingdom) =

- 3rd Army formation badge.
- Active: 1915–1919
- Country: United Kingdom
- Branch: British Army
- Type: Field army
- Engagements: Battle of the Somme; Battle of Arras; Battle of Cambrai; Battle of Passchendaele; Battle of Amiens; Hundred Days Offensive

Commanders
- Notable commanders: Edmund Allenby; Sir Julian Byng

The Third Army was a field army of the British Army during World War I that saw active service on the Western Front throughout the war.

== First World War ==
The Third Army was part of the British Army during World War I. It was formed in France on 13 July 1915, under the command of Lieutenant-General Charles Monro. During August 1915 the Third Army took over a trench line south of the French Tenth Army, which had to keep in position for the forthcoming autumn offensive. This made the Third Army geographically separate from the other British armies for the time being. This remained the case until March 1916, when the Tenth Army was moved to take part in the Battle of Verdun because of French losses and the Fourth Army was formed in preparation for the Battle of the Somme.

The battles it took part in on the Western Front included:

- Battle of the Somme
- Battle of Cambrai
- Second Battle of Arras (April 1917)
- Battle of Passchendaele
- Battle of Amiens (August 1918)
- Hundred Days Offensive

=== Order of battle ===
Third Army Order of Battle, August 1918.

- IV Corps
  - 37th Division
  - 42nd (East Lancashire) Division
  - 62nd (2nd West Riding) Division
  - New Zealand Division
  - 5th Division
- V Corps
  - 21st Division
  - 38th (Welsh) Division
  - 17th (Northern) Division
  - 33rd Division
- VI Corps
  - Guards Division
  - 2nd Division
  - 3rd Division
  - 59th (2nd North Midland) Division
- XVII Corps
  - 51st (Highland) Division
  - 52nd Division
  - 56th (London) Division
  - 57th (2nd West Lancashire) Division
  - 63rd (Royal Naval) Division

=== Commanders ===
- General Charles Monro (July–September 1915)
- General Edmund Allenby (23 October 1915 – 9 June 1917)
- General Sir Julian Byng (9 June 1917 – 22 March 1919)

== Second World War ==
The army was not reraised during the Second World War. However, due to various Allied deception efforts, German intelligence over-estimated the number of Allied forces based within the UK by the start of 1944. While there was no specific deception effort to create the Third Army, German intelligence believed that one had been formed from Northern Command.

== Sources ==
- Harper, Glyn (2007). Dark Journey. Auckland, NZ: HarperCollins. ISBN 978-1-86950-579-0.
- Hesketh, Roger (2000). Fortitude: The D-Day Deception Campaign. Woodstock: Overlook Hardcover. ISBN 978-1-585-67075-8.
- Holmes, Richard (2004). The Little Field Marshal: A Life of Sir John French. Weidenfeld & Nicolson. ISBN 0-297-84614-0.
- Robson, Stuart (2007). The First World War (1st ed.). Harrow: Pearson Longman. ISBN 978-1-4058-2471-2 – via Archive Foundation.
