= XVIII Brigade, Royal Horse Artillery (T.F.) =

Former horse artillery brigade of the British Army

- Active: July 1917 – April 1919
- Country: United Kingdom
- Branch: British Army
- Type: Artillery
- Size: Battalion
- Part of: ANZAC Mounted Division
- Equipment: Ordnance QF 18-pounder Ordnance QF 13-pounder
- Engagements: World War I Sinai and Palestine 1917-18 Battle of Beersheba Battle of Mughar Ridge Battle of Jerusalem Capture of Jericho First and Second Trans-Jordan Raids Battle of Abu Tellul Capture of Amman

XVIII Brigade, Royal Horse Artillery (Territorial Force) was a Royal Horse Artillery brigade (Note: The basic organic unit of the Royal Artillery was, and is, the Battery. When grouped together they formed brigades, in the same way that infantry battalions or cavalry regiments were grouped together in brigades. At the outbreak of World War I, a field artillery brigade of headquarters (4 officers, 37 other ranks), three batteries (5 and 193 each), and a brigade ammunition column (4 and 154) had a total strength just under 800 so was broadly comparable to an infantry battalion (just over 1,000) or a cavalry regiment (about 550). Like an infantry battalion, an artillery brigade was usually commanded by a Lieutenant-Colonel. Artillery brigades were redesignated as regiments in 1938. Note that the battery strength refers to a battery of six guns; a four-gun battery would be about two thirds of this.) of the Territorial Force that was formed by the Egyptian Expeditionary Force in Palestine in July 1917 for the ANZAC Mounted Division. It served with the division thereafter in the Sinai and Palestine Campaign and was broken up after the end of World War I.

== History ==
=== Background ===
The ANZAC Mounted Division was formed in Egypt in March 1916 with four cavalry brigades. Four British Territorial Force horse artillery batteries were assigned to the division to provide artillery support (one per brigade). These were controlled by two Royal Horse Artillery brigade headquarters: III Brigade, RHA (T.F.) and IV Brigade, RHA (T.F.). The ANZAC Mounted Division served with the Desert Column in the Sinai and Palestine Campaign from the Battle of Magdhaba (23 December 1916) through to the Second Battle of Gaza (17 – 19 April 1917).

In June 1917, the Desert Column was reorganised from two mounted divisions of four brigades each (ANZAC and Imperial Mounted Divisions) to three mounted divisions of three brigades each (ANZAC, Australian – Imperial Mounted Division renamed – and the new Yeomanry Mounted Division). Consequently, the British 22nd Mounted Brigade was transferred from the ANZAC to the Yeomanry Mounted Division on 6 July 1917. With a reduction to three brigades, there was a corresponding reduction in the artillery to three batteries. The Leicestershire Battery, RHA (T.F.) departed on 20 June to join XX Brigade, RHA (T.F.) in the Yeomanry Mounted Division. (Note: 22nd Mounted Brigade was originally designated as the North Midland Mounted Brigade. Leicestershire RHA had been formed in 1908 for this brigade and was mobilised with it in 1914.)

=== Formation ===
In July 1917, the artillery of the ANZAC Mounted Division was reorganized. The existing III and IV Brigade HQs were dissolved and XVIII Brigade, Royal Horse Artillery (Territorial Force) was formed for the division with

Ayrshire Battery, RHA (T.F.) from IV Brigade
Inverness-shire Battery, RHA (T.F.) also from IV Brigade
Somerset Battery, RHA (T.F.) from III Brigade

In practice, the batteries were permanently attached to the mounted brigades: Somerset RHA to the 1st Light Horse Brigade, Inverness-shire RHA to the 2nd Light Horse Brigade and Ayrshire RHA to the New Zealand Mounted Rifles Brigade.

The batteries had each been re-equipped with four 18 pounders before the First Battle of Gaza in March 1917. They were still equipped with 18 pounders when the brigade was organised but were re-equipped with 13 pounders (four per battery) in time for the Third Battle of Gaza at the end of October 1917.

=== Service ===
The brigade, and its batteries, served with the ANZAC Mounted Division throughout the rest of the Sinai and Palestine Campaign. As part of the Desert Mounted Corps, the division took part in the Third Battle of Gaza, in particular the Capture of Beersheba (31 October) and the Battle of Mughar Ridge (13 and 14 November), and the defence of Jerusalem against the Turkish counter-attacks (27 November – 3 December).

At the beginning of 1918, the division was attached to XX Corps and helped to capture Jericho (19 – 21 February) and then formed part of Shea's Force for the First Trans-Jordan Raid (21 March – 2 April). It returned to the Desert Mounted Corps for the Second Trans-Jordan Raid (30 April – 4 May), the Battle of Abu Tellul (14 July) and the capture of Amman (25 September).

=== Dissolved ===
After the Armistice of Mudros, the division was withdrawn to Egypt. The Australian brigades departed for home in March and April 1919 and the New Zealanders by the end of July. The brigade was broken up some time after April 1919.

== Bibliography ==
- Becke, Archibald F. (1936). Order of Battle of Divisions Part 2A. The Territorial Force Mounted Divisions and the 1st-Line Territorial Force Divisions (42–56). London: HMSO. OCLC 4405016.
- Farndale, General Sir Martin (1988). The Forgotten Fronts and the Home Base, 1914–18. History of the Royal Regiment of Artillery. Woolwich: The Royal Artillery Institution. ISBN 1-870114-05-1.
- Frederick, J.B.M. (1984). Lineage Book of British Land Forces 1660–1978. Wakefield, Yorkshire: Microform Academic Publishers. ISBN 1-85117-009-X.
- Perry, F.W. (1992). Order of Battle of Divisions Part 5A. The Divisions of Australia, Canada and New Zealand and those in East Africa. Newport: Ray Westlake Military Books. ISBN 1-871167-25-6.
