= Inverness-shire Royal Horse Artillery =

Former British Army horse artillery battery

Inverness-shire Royal Horse Artillery (T.F.) 1/1st Inverness-shire RHA (T.F.)
- Active: 11 June 1908 – April 1919
- Country: United Kingdom
- Branch: British Army
- Type: Artillery
- Size: Battery
- Part of: Highland Mounted Brigade; IV Brigade, RHA (T.F.); XVIII Brigade, RHA (T.F.)
- peacetime HQ: Inverness
- Equipment: Ordnance QF 15-pounder Ordnance QF 18-pounder Ordnance QF 13-pounder
- Engagements: First World War Sinai and Palestine 1916-18 Battle of Romani Battle of Magdhaba Battle of Rafah First and Second Battles of Gaza Battle of Beersheba Battle of Mughar Ridge Battle of Jerusalem Capture of Jericho First and Second Trans-Jordan Raids Battle of Abu Tellul Capture of Amman

The Inverness-shire Royal Horse Artillery was a Territorial Force Royal Horse Artillery battery that was formed in Inverness-shire in 1908. It saw active service during the First World War in the Sinai and Palestine Campaign with the ANZAC Mounted Division from 1916 to 1918. A second line battery, 2/1st Inverness-shire RHA, served in the United Kingdom throughout the war. It was disembodied after the end of the war and was reconstituted as a Royal Field Artillery battery in 1920.

== History ==
=== Formation ===
The Territorial Force (TF) was formed on 1 April 1908 following the enactment of the Territorial and Reserve Forces Act 1907 (7 Edw.7, c.9) which combined and re-organised the old Volunteer Force, the Honourable Artillery Company and the Yeomanry. On formation, the TF contained 14 infantry divisions and 14 mounted yeomanry brigades. Each yeomanry brigade included a horse artillery battery and an ammunition column.

On 18 March 1908, Inverness-shire Royal Horse Artillery (Territorial Force) was proposed as a new unit and it was recognised by the Army Council on 11 June 1908. It consisted of:

- Battery HQ at Margaret Street, Inverness
- Inverness-shire Battery at Inverness
- Highland Mounted Brigade Ammunition Column at King Street, Nairn

The battery and ammunition column included experienced men from the former Highland Royal Garrison Artillery (Volunteers). The battery was equipped with four Ehrhardt 15-pounder guns and allocated as artillery support to the Highland Mounted Brigade.

=== First World War ===
In accordance with the Territorial and Reserve Forces Act 1907 (7 Edw.7, c.9) which brought the Territorial Force into being, the TF was intended to be a home defence force for service during wartime and members could not be compelled to serve outside the country. However, on the outbreak of war on 4 August 1914, many members volunteered for Imperial Service. Therefore, TF units were split into 1st Line (liable for overseas service) and 2nd Line (home service for those unable or unwilling to serve overseas) units. 2nd Line units performed the home defence role, although in fact most of these were also posted abroad in due course.

==== 1/1st Inverness-shire ====
The battery was embodied with the Highland Mounted Brigade on 4 August 1914 at the outbreak of the First World War. The brigade was placed under First Army of Central Force; it moved to the Huntingdon area and then to Lincolnshire in November 1914. In March 1915, the battery was attached to 2/1st South Midland Mounted Brigade (along with its 2nd line, 2/1st Inverness-shire RHA) in 2/2nd Mounted Division in Norfolk. The battery remained in the United Kingdom until February 1916 when it (and its ammunition column) was embarked at Southampton and transported to Egypt, landing at Alexandria between 22 and 25 February 1916.

Service with IV Brigade

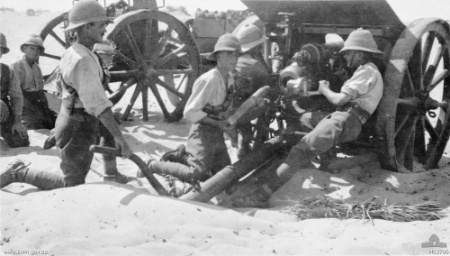
British artillerymen loading an 18 pounder gun at Romani in 1916

IV Brigade, Royal Horse Artillery (T.F.) was formed in April 1916 in the Egyptian Expeditionary Force with the Ayrshire and Inverness-shire Batteries, RHA. (Note: III Brigade, Royal Horse Artillery (T.F.) was formed at the same time with Leicestershire Battery, RHA (T.F.) and Somerset Battery, RHA (T.F.).) It was assigned to the ANZAC Mounted Division to provide artillery support. In practice, the batteries were permanently attached to the mounted brigades of the division and Inverness-shire RHA joined the Australian 3rd Light Horse Brigade. When the 3rd Light Horse Brigade was transferred to the Imperial Mounted Division in January 1917, it was replaced by the British 22nd Mounted Brigade. Inverness-shire RHA remained with the ANZAC Mounted Division and was attached to 22nd Mounted Brigade thereafter.

The battery served with the ANZAC Mounted Division in the Sinai and Palestine Campaign throughout the rest of the war. With the division, it saw action at the Battle of Romani (4 – 14 August 1916) as part of No. 3 Section, Suez Canal Defences. This saw the repulse of the final Turkish attempt to cut the Suez Canal.

The division then joined the Desert Column and with it took part in the advance across the Sinai. It fought at the Battle of Magdhaba (23 December 1916) and the Battle of Rafah (9 January 1917). The batteries were then re-equipped with four 18 pounders each before taking part in the First (26 – 27 March 1917) and Second Battles of Gaza (17 – 19 April 1917).

Service with XVIII Brigade

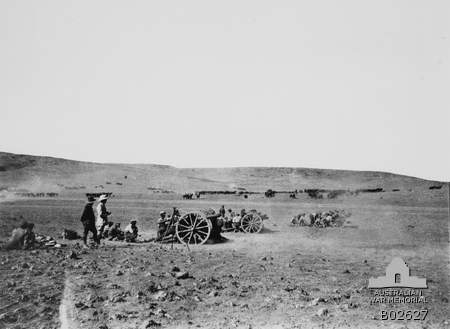
In action at Tel el Khuweilfeh, 2 November 1917

In June 1917, the Desert Column was reorganised from two mounted divisions of four brigades each (ANZAC and Imperial Mounted Divisions) to three mounted divisions of three brigades each (ANZAC, Australian – Imperial Mounted Division renamed – and the new Yeomanry Mounted Division). Consequently, the 22nd Mounted Brigade was transferred from the ANZAC to the Yeomanry Mounted Division on 6 July 1917. With a reduction to three brigades, there was a corresponding reduction in the artillery to three batteries. The Leicestershire Battery, RHA (T.F.) departed on 20 June to join XX Brigade, RHA (T.F.) in the Yeomanry Mounted Division. (Note: 22nd Mounted Brigade was originally designated as the North Midland Mounted Brigade. Leicestershire RHA had been formed in 1908 for this brigade and was mobilised with it in 1914.)

This led to a reorganization of ANZAC Mounted Division's artillery. A new headquarters, XVIII Brigade, Royal Horse Artillery (T.F.), was formed for the division and took command of Inverness-shire and Ayrshire RHA. They were joined by Somerset RHA of III Brigade, Royal Horse Artillery (T.F.). (Note: Frederick makes clear that XVIII Brigade was distinct from IV Brigade and was not IV Brigade redesignated.) Inverness-shire RHA was now attached to the 2nd Light Horse Brigade. The batteries were still equipped with 18 pounders when the new brigade was organised but were re-equipped with 13 pounders (four per battery) in time for the Third Battle of Gaza at the end of October 1917.

The brigade, and its batteries, remained with the ANZAC Mounted Division for the rest of the Sinai and Palestine Campaign. As part of the Desert Mounted Corps, the division took part in the Third Battle of Gaza, in particular the Capture of Beersheba (31 October) and the Battle of Mughar Ridge (13 and 14 November), and the defence of Jerusalem against the Turkish counter-attacks (27 November – 3 December).

At the beginning of 1918, the division was attached to XX Corps and helped to capture Jericho (19 – 21 February) and then formed part of Shea's Force for the First Trans-Jordan Raid (21 March – 2 April). It returned to the Desert Mounted Corps for the Second Trans-Jordan Raid (30 April – 4 May), the Battle of Abu Tellul (14 July) and the capture of Amman (25 September).

After the Armistice of Mudros, the division was withdrawn to Egypt. The Australian brigades departed for home in March and April 1919 and the New Zealanders by the end of July. The brigade was broken up some time after April 1919.

==== 2/1st Inverness-shire ====
2/1st Inverness-shire RHA (T.F.)
- Active: 1914 – 1919
- Country: United Kingdom
- Branch: British Army
- Type: Artillery
- Size: Battery
- Part of: 2/1st Highland Mounted Brigade; 2/1st South Midland Mounted Brigade
- Equipment: Ordnance QF 15-pounder
- Service: First World War

Inverness-shire RHA formed a 2nd line in 1914, initially designated as the Inverness-shire (Reserve) Battery RHA and later given a fractional designation as 2/1st Inverness-shire Battery, RHA. 2/1st Highland Mounted Brigade was formed in January 1915.

In March 1915, the battery was attached to 2/1st South Midland Mounted Brigade (along with its 1st line, 1/1st Inverness-shire RHA) in 2/2nd Mounted Division in Norfolk. It moved to Lark Hill on 18 December 1915 and spent the whole of the war in the United Kingdom.

=== Post war ===
The Inverness-shire RHA was not reconstituted until 7 February 1920 when it formed a battery (later numbered 297th) in 1st Highland Brigade, Royal Field Artillery (later 75th (Highland) Field Regiment, RA) and ceased to be a Royal Horse Artillery battery. In 1939, 297 Field Battery was converted into 297 (Inverness) Heavy Anti-Aircraft Battery, an independent unit that later joined 101st Heavy Anti-Aircraft Regiment and fought in the defence of Scapa Flow and later in the Burma campaign.

== See also ==
- List of Territorial Force horse artillery batteries 1908

== Bibliography ==
- Becke, Archibald F. (1936). Order of Battle of Divisions Part 2A. The Territorial Force Mounted Divisions and the 1st-Line Territorial Force Divisions (42–56). London: HMSO. OCLC 4405016.
- Clarke, Dale (2004). British Artillery 1914–19 Field Army Artillery. Vol. 94 of New Vanguard Series. Oxford: Osprey Publishing. ISBN 1-84176-688-7.
- Farndale, General Sir Martin (1988). The Forgotten Fronts and the Home Base, 1914–18. History of the Royal Regiment of Artillery. Woolwich: The Royal Artillery Institution. ISBN 1-870114-05-1.
- Frederick, J.B.M. (1984). Lineage Book of British Land Forces 1660–1978. Wakefield, Yorkshire: Microform Academic Publishers. ISBN 1-85117-009-X.
- James, Brigadier E.A. (1978). British Regiments 1914–18. London: Samson Books Limited. ISBN 0-906304-03-2.
- Litchfield, Norman E.H., (1992) The Territorial Artillery 1908–1988 (Their Lineage, Uniforms and Badges), Nottingham: Sherwood Press, ISBN 0-9508205-2-0.
- Perry, F.W. (1992). Order of Battle of Divisions Part 5A. The Divisions of Australia, Canada and New Zealand and those in East Africa. Newport: Ray Westlake Military Books. ISBN 1-871167-25-6.
- Rinaldi, Richard A (2008). Order of Battle of the British Army 1914. Ravi Rikhye. ISBN 978-0-97760728-0.
- Westlake, Ray (1992). British Territorial Units 1914–18. Osprey Publishing. ISBN 978-1-85532-168-7.
