= Somerset Royal Horse Artillery =

Former British Army horse artillery battery

Somerset Royal Horse Artillery (T.F.) 1/1st Somerset RHA (T.F.)
- Active: 30 September 1908 – April 1919
- Country: United Kingdom
- Branch: British Army
- Type: Artillery
- Size: Battery
- Part of: 2nd South Western Mounted Brigade; III Brigade, RHA (T.F.); XVIII Brigade, RHA (T.F.)
- peacetime HQ: Taunton
- Equipment: Ordnance QF 15-pounder Ordnance QF 18-pounder Ordnance QF 13-pounder
- Engagements: First World War Sinai and Palestine 1916-18 Battle of Romani Battle of Magdhaba Battle of Rafah First and Second Battles of Gaza Battle of Beersheba Battle of Mughar Ridge Battle of Jerusalem Capture of Jericho First and Second Trans-Jordan Raids Battle of Abu Tellul Capture of Amman

The Somerset Royal Horse Artillery was a Territorial Force Royal Horse Artillery battery that was formed in Somerset in 1908. It saw active service during the First World War in the Sinai and Palestine Campaign with the ANZAC Mounted Division from 1916 to 1918. A second line battery, 2/1st Somerset RHA, served on the Western Front with the 63rd (Royal Naval) Division from 1916 to 1918. It was disembodied after the end of the war and was not reconstituted in the Territorial Force in 1920.

== History ==
=== Formation ===
The Territorial Force (TF) was formed on 1 April 1908 following the enactment of the Territorial and Reserve Forces Act 1907 (7 Edw.7, c.9) which combined and re-organised the old Volunteer Force, the Honourable Artillery Company and the Yeomanry. On formation, the TF contained 14 infantry divisions and 14 mounted yeomanry brigades. Each yeomanry brigade included a horse artillery battery and an ammunition column.

On 18 March 1908, Somerset Royal Horse Artillery (Territorial Force) was proposed as a new unit and it was recognized by the Army Council on 30 September 1908 (and the ammunition column on 2 December 1908). The unit consisted of

Battery HQ at Taunton
Somerset Battery at Taunton
2nd South Western Mounted Brigade Ammunition Column also at Taunton

The battery was equipped with four Ehrhardt 15-pounder guns and allocated as artillery support to the 2nd South Western Mounted Brigade.

=== First World War ===
In accordance with the Territorial and Reserve Forces Act 1907 (7 Edw.7, c.9) which brought the Territorial Force into being, the TF was intended to be a home defence force for service during wartime and members could not be compelled to serve outside the country. However, on the outbreak of war on 4 August 1914, many members volunteered for Imperial Service. Therefore, TF units were split into 1st Line (liable for overseas service) and 2nd Line (home service for those unable or unwilling to serve overseas) units. 2nd Line units performed the home defence role, although in fact most of these were also posted abroad in due course.

==== 1/1st Somerset ====
The battery was embodied with the 2nd South Western Mounted Brigade on 4 August 1914 at the outbreak of the First World War. The brigade was assigned to the Third Army of Central Force and moved to the Colchester area of Essex in August 1914 where it remained until September 1915. In late September 1915, the 2nd South Western Mounted Brigade (without the battery) was dismounted and left Essex for Liverpool en route to Gallipoli. The battery remained in the United Kingdom until February 1916 when it (and its ammunition column) was embarked at Southampton and transported to Alexandria in Egypt.

Service with III Brigade

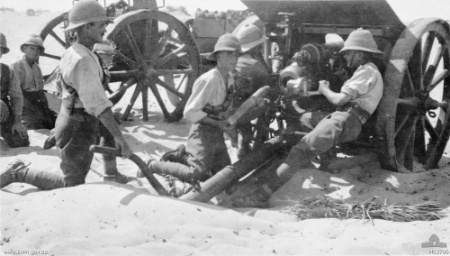
British artillerymen loading an 18 pounder gun at Romani in 1916

III Brigade, Royal Horse Artillery (T.F.) was formed in April 1916 in the Egyptian Expeditionary Force with the Leicestershire and Somerset Batteries, RHA. (Note: IV Brigade, Royal Horse Artillery (T.F.) was formed at the same time with Ayrshire Battery, RHA (T.F.) and Inverness-shire Battery, RHA (T.F.).) It was assigned to the ANZAC Mounted Division to provide artillery support. In practice, the batteries were permanently attached to the mounted brigades of the division and Somerset RHA joined the Australian 2nd Light Horse Brigade.

The battery served with the ANZAC Mounted Division in the Sinai and Palestine Campaign throughout the rest of the war. With the division, it saw action at the Battle of Romani (4 – 14 August 1916) as part of No. 3 Section, Suez Canal Defences. This saw the repulse of the final Turkish attempt to cut the Suez Canal.

The division then joined the Desert Column and with it took part in the advance across the Sinai. It fought at the Battle of Magdhaba (23 December 1916) and the Battle of Rafah (9 January 1917). The batteries were then re-equipped with four 18 pounders each before taking part in the First (26 – 27 March 1917) and Second Battles of Gaza (17 – 9 April 1917).

Service with XVIII Brigade

In June 1917, the Desert Column was reorganised from two mounted divisions of four brigades each (ANZAC and Imperial Mounted Divisions) to three mounted divisions of three brigades each (ANZAC, Australian – Imperial Mounted Division renamed – and the new Yeomanry Mounted Division). Consequently, the 22nd Mounted Brigade was transferred from the ANZAC to the Yeomanry Mounted Division on 6 July 1917. With a reduction to three brigades, there was a corresponding reduction in the artillery to three batteries. The Leicestershire Battery departed on 20 June to join XX Brigade, RHA (T.F.) in the Yeomanry Mounted Division. (Note: 22nd Mounted Brigade was originally designated as the North Midland Mounted Brigade. Leicestershire RHA had been formed in 1908 for this brigade and was mobilised with it in 1914.)

This led to a reorganization of ANZAC Mounted Division's artillery. A new headquarters, XVIII Brigade, Royal Horse Artillery (T.F.), was formed for the division and took command of the Somerset Battery and Inverness-shire and Ayrshire Batteries of IV Brigade, Royal Horse Artillery (T.F.). (Note: Frederick makes clear that XVIII Brigade was distinct from III and IV Brigades and was not either one redesignated.) Somerset RHA was now attached to the 1st Light Horse Brigade. The batteries were still equipped with 18 pounders when the new brigade was organised but were re-equipped with 13 pounders (four per battery) in time for the Third Battle of Gaza at the end of October 1917.

The brigade, and its batteries, remained with the ANZAC Mounted Division for the rest of the Sinai and Palestine Campaign. As part of the Desert Mounted Corps, the division took part in the Third Battle of Gaza, in particular the Capture of Beersheba (31 October) and the Battle of Mughar Ridge (13 and 14 November), and the defence of Jerusalem against the Turkish counter-attacks (27 November – 3 December).

At the beginning of 1918, the division was attached to XX Corps and helped to capture Jericho (19 – 21 February) and then formed part of Shea's Force for the First Trans-Jordan Raid (21 March – 2 April). It returned to the Desert Mounted Corps for the Second Trans-Jordan Raid (30 April – 4 May), the Battle of Abu Tellul (14 July) and the capture of Amman (25 September).

After the Armistice of Mudros, the division was withdrawn to Egypt. The Australian brigades departed for home in March and April 1919 and the New Zealanders by the end of July. The brigade was broken up some time after April 1919.

==== 2/1st Somerset ====
2/1st Somerset RHA (T.F.)
- Active: 1914 – April 1919
- Country: United Kingdom
- Branch: British Army
- Type: Artillery
- Size: Battery
- Part of: 2/2nd South Western Mounted Brigade; CCCXVIII Brigade, RFA (T.F.); CCXXIII Brigade, RFA (T.F.)
- Equipment: Ordnance QF 15-pounder Ordnance QF 18-pounder
- Engagements: First World War Western Front Battle of the Ancre Battle of Arras (1917) Third Battle of Ypres First Battles of the Somme Battle of Albert (1918) Battle of Drocourt-Quéant Line Battle of the Canal du Nord Battle of Cambrai (1918)

Somerset RHA formed a 2nd line in 1914, initially designated as the Somerset (Reserve) Battery RHA and later given a fractional designation as 2/1st Somerset Battery, RHA. 2/2nd South Western Mounted Brigade was formed in January 1915.

The pre-war Territorial Force infantry divisions were generally (Note: 51st (Highland) Division was exceptional in that it had three field and one mountain artillery brigade.) supported by four field artillery brigades. (Note: The basic organic unit of the Royal Artillery was, and is, the Battery. When grouped together they formed brigades, in the same way that infantry battalions or cavalry regiments were grouped together in brigades. At the outbreak of the First World War, a field artillery brigade of headquarters (4 officers, 37 other ranks), three batteries (5 and 193 each), and a brigade ammunition column (4 and 154) had a total strength just under 800 so was broadly comparable to an infantry battalion (just over 1,000) or a cavalry regiment (about 550). Like an infantry battalion, an artillery brigade was usually commanded by a Lieutenant-Colonel. Artillery brigades were redesignated as regiments in 1938. Note that the battery strength refers to a battery of six guns; a four-gun battery would be about two thirds of this.) These were numbered I, II, III and IV within each division and consisted of three gun brigades (each of three batteries, equipped with four 15-pounder guns) and a howitzer brigade (two batteries of four 5" howitzers). Artillery for 2nd Line divisions were formed in a similar manner, with a fractional designation, for example the artillery for the 63rd (2nd Northumberland) Division consisted of 2/I Northumberland Brigade, RFA (with 2/1st, 2/2nd and 2/3rd Northumberland Batteries, RFA), 2/II Northumberland Brigade, RFA (with 2/1st, 2/2nd and 2/3rd East Riding Batteries, RFA), 2/III Northumberland Brigade, RFA (with 2/1st, 2/2nd and 2/3rd Durham Batteries, RFA) and 2/IV Northumberland (Howitzer) Brigade, RFA (with 2/4th and 2/5th Durham (Howitzer) Batteries, RFA).

Between 8 and 22 May 1916, the artillery of 63rd (2nd Northumberland) Division was reorganized. The brigades were numbered (CCCXV, CCCXVI, CCCXVII, and CCCXVIII) and the batteries lettered (so 2/1st Northumberland Battery became A Battery, CCCXV Brigade). The howitzer batteries of CCCXVIII Brigade were transferred to CCCXV and CCCXVI brigades and the brigade was reformed with three gun batteries. 2/1st Leicestershire RHA joined as A Battery and 2/1st Somerset RHA as B Battery. The batteries each consisted of four 18 pounders.

On 2 July 1916, the 63rd (2nd Northumberland) Division's artillery left for France where it joined the Royal Naval Division. (Note: The 63rd (2nd Northumberland) Division was broken up on 21 July 1916 and the Royal Naval Division immediately adopted its number as 63rd (Royal Naval) Division.) On 18 July, A (Howitzer) Battery of XXCCIII Brigade (formerly 1/4th Kent (Howitzer) Battery of 1/IV Home Counties (Howitzer) Brigade) joined the brigade as D (Howitzer) Battery. With the breakup of XXCCIII Brigade, CCCXVIII Brigade was redesignated XXCCIII Brigade on 31 July. On 31 August, the batteries of the brigade were made up to 6 guns apiece and the battery now consisted of six 18 pounders.

The battery, and the brigade, served with 63rd (Royal Naval) Division for the rest of the war on the Western Front. With the division, it took part in the Battle of the Ancre (13 – 15 November 1916), Operations on the Ancre (20 January – 27 February 1917) and Battle of Miraumont (17 and 18 February). It then took part in the Battles of Arras, notably the Second Battle of the Scarpe (23 and 24 April) and the Battle of Arleux (28 and 29 April). At the end of 1917, it took part in the Third Battle of Ypres notably the Second Battle of Passchendaele (26 October – 5 November) and Welch Ridge (30 and 31 December).

In 1918, the division faced the German offensive in the First Battles of the Somme: Battle of St. Quentin (21 – 23 March), First Battle of Bapaume (24 and 25 March), and the Battle of the Ancre (5 April). Then followed the advance to victory: the Battle of Albert (21 – 23 August), Battle of Drocourt-Quéant Line (2 and 3 September), Battle of the Canal du Nord (27 September – 1 October), Battle of Cambrai and Capture of Niergnies (both on 8 October) and the Passage of the Grande Honnelle (7 November).

At the Armistice, the battery (six 18 pounders) was still with CCXXIII Brigade, RFA serving with 63rd (Royal Naval) Division. The division did was not selected to form part of the Army of Occupation and by April 1919 it had been disbanded.

=== Post war ===
The Somerset Royal Horse Artillery was not reconstituted in the Territorial Force in 1920.

== See also ==
- List of Territorial Force horse artillery batteries 1908

== Bibliography ==
- Becke, Archibald F. (1936). Order of Battle of Divisions Part 2A. The Territorial Force Mounted Divisions and the 1st-Line Territorial Force Divisions (42–56). London: HMSO. OCLC 4405016.
- Becke, Archibald F. (1937). Order of Battle of Divisions Part 2B. The 2nd-Line Territorial Force Divisions (57th–69th) with The Home-Service Divisions (71st–73rd) and 74th and 75th Divisions. London: HMSO. OCLC 4405016.
- Becke, Archibald F. (1945). Order of Battle of Divisions Part 3B. New Army Divisions (30-41) & 63rd (R.N.) Division. London: HMSO. OCLC 4405016.
- Clarke, Dale (2004). British Artillery 1914–19 Field Army Artillery. Vol. 94 of New Vanguard Series. Oxford: Osprey Publishing. ISBN 1-84176-688-7.
- Farndale, General Sir Martin (1988). The Forgotten Fronts and the Home Base, 1914–18. History of the Royal Regiment of Artillery. Woolwich: The Royal Artillery Institution. ISBN 1-870114-05-1.
- Frederick, J.B.M. (1984). Lineage Book of British Land Forces 1660–1978. Wakefield, Yorkshire: Microform Academic Publishers. ISBN 1-85117-009-X.
- James, Brigadier E.A. (1978). British Regiments 1914–18. London: Samson Books Limited. ISBN 0-906304-03-2.
- Perry, F.W. (1992). Order of Battle of Divisions Part 5A. The Divisions of Australia, Canada and New Zealand and those in East Africa. Newport: Ray Westlake Military Books. ISBN 1-871167-25-6.
- Rinaldi, Richard A (2008). Order of Battle of the British Army 1914. Ravi Rikhye. ISBN 978-0-97760728-0.
- Westlake, Ray (1992). British Territorial Units 1914–18. Osprey Publishing. ISBN 978-1-85532-168-7.
- Order of Battle of the British Armies in France, November 11th, 1918. France: General Staff, GHQ. 1918.
