= III Brigade, Royal Horse Artillery (T.F.) =

Former horse artillery brigade of the British Army

- Active: April 1916 – July 1917
- Country: United Kingdom
- Branch: British Army
- Type: Artillery
- Size: Battalion
- Part of: ANZAC Mounted Division
- Equipment: Ordnance QF 15-pounder Ordnance QF 18-pounder
- Engagements: World War I Sinai and Palestine 1916-17 Battle of Romani Battle of Magdhaba Battle of Rafah First and Second Battles of Gaza

III Brigade, Royal Horse Artillery (Territorial Force), along with its sister IV Brigade, Royal Horse Artillery (T.F.), was a Royal Horse Artillery brigade (Note: The basic organic unit of the Royal Artillery was, and is, the Battery. When grouped together they formed brigades, in the same way that infantry battalions or cavalry regiments were grouped together in brigades. At the outbreak of World War I, a field artillery brigade of headquarters (4 officers, 37 other ranks), three batteries (5 and 193 each), and a brigade ammunition column (4 and 154) had a total strength just under 800 so was broadly comparable to an infantry battalion (just over 1,000) or a cavalry regiment (about 550). Like an infantry battalion, an artillery brigade was usually commanded by a Lieutenant-Colonel. Artillery brigades were redesignated as regiments in 1938. Note that the battery strength refers to a battery of six guns; a four-gun battery would be about two thirds of this.) of the Territorial Force that was formed in Egypt in April 1916 for the ANZAC Mounted Division.

Both brigades served with the ANZAC Mounted Division during the Sinai and Palestine Campaign of World War I. In July 1917, the division's artillery was reorganized and the brigade headquarters were dissolved.

== History ==
=== Formation ===
The ANZAC Mounted Division was formed in Egypt in March 1916 with four cavalry brigades, each of three regiments: the Australian 1st, 2nd and 3rd Light Horse Brigades and the New Zealand Mounted Rifles Brigade. Four British Territorial Force horse artillery batteries were assigned to the division to provide artillery support, one per brigade.

III Brigade, Royal Horse Artillery (Territorial Force) was formed in April 1916 in the Egyptian Expeditionary Force for the division with (Note: IV Brigade, Royal Horse Artillery (Territorial Force) was formed at the same time with Ayrshire Battery, RHA (T.F.) and Inverness-shire Battery, RHA (T.F.).)

Leicestershire Battery, RHA (T.F.)
Somerset Battery, RHA (T.F.)

The batteries had been assigned to the North Midland and 2nd South Western Mounted Brigades, respectively, at the outbreak of the war, each equipped with four Ehrhardt 15-pounder guns. The batteries had arrived in Egypt independently; Leicestershire RHA landed at Alexandria on 25 February 1916.

In practice, the batteries were permanently attached to the mounted brigades: Leicestershire RHA to the 1st Light Horse Brigade and Somerset RHA to the 2nd Light Horse Brigade.

=== Active service ===
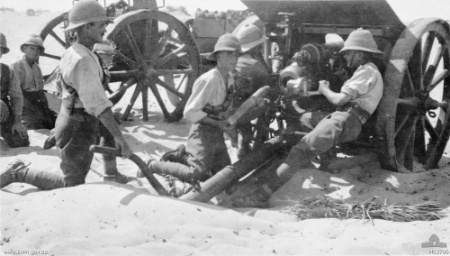
British artillerymen loading an 18 pounder gun at Romani in 1916

The brigade, and its batteries, served with the ANZAC Mounted Division in the Sinai and Palestine Campaign until July 1917. With the division, it saw action at the Battle of Romani (4 – 14 August 1916) as part of No. 3 Section, Suez Canal Defences. This saw the repulse of the final Turkish attempt to cut the Suez Canal.

The division then joined the Desert Column and with it took part in the advance across the Sinai. It fought at the Battle of Magdhaba (23 December 1916) and the Battle of Rafah (9 January 1917). The batteries were then re-equipped with four 18 pounders each. They then took part in the First (26 – 27 March 1917) and Second Battles of Gaza (17 – 19 April 1917).

=== Reorganised ===
Leicestershire RHA departed on 20 June 1917 for the Yeomanry Mounted Division. It formed part of XX Brigade, Royal Horse Artillery (T.F.) from 5 July.

In July 1917, the artillery of the ANZAC Mounted Division was reorganised. A new headquarters, XVIII Brigade, Royal Horse Artillery (T.F.), was formed for the division and took command of Somerset RHA. It was joined by Inverness-shire and Ayrshire RHA of IV Brigade, RHA (T.F.). With the departure of its batteries, III Brigade was dissolved. (Note: Frederick makes clear that XVIII Brigade was distinct from III Brigade and was not III Brigade redesignated.)

== Bibliography ==
- Becke, Major A.F. (1936). Order of Battle of Divisions Part 2A. The Territorial Force Mounted Divisions and the 1st-Line Territorial Force Divisions (42–56). London: His Majesty's Stationery Office.
- Clarke, Dale (2004). British Artillery 1914–19 Field Army Artillery. Vol. 94 of New Vanguard Series. Oxford: Osprey Publishing. ISBN 1-84176-688-7.
- Farndale, General Sir Martin (1988). The Forgotten Fronts and the Home Base, 1914–18. History of the Royal Regiment of Artillery. Woolwich: The Royal Artillery Institution. ISBN 1-870114-05-1.
- Frederick, J.B.M. (1984). Lineage Book of British Land Forces 1660–1978. Wakefield, Yorkshire: Microform Academic Publishers. ISBN 1-85117-009-X.
- Gullett, Henry Somer (1923). The Australian Imperial Force in Sinai and Palestine, 1914–1918. Official History of Australia in the War of 1914–1918. Vol. VII. Sydney: Angus and Robertson. OCLC 59863829.
- Perry, F.W. (1992). Order of Battle of Divisions Part 5A. The Divisions of Australia, Canada and New Zealand and those in East Africa. Newport: Ray Westlake Military Books. ISBN 1-871167-25-6.
- Westlake, Ray (1992). British Territorial Units 1914–18. Osprey Publishing. ISBN 978-1-85532-168-7.
