= Leicestershire Royal Horse Artillery =

Former British Army horse artillery battery

Leicestershire Royal Horse Artillery (T.F.) 1/1st Leicestershire RHA (T.F.)
- Active: 21 July 1908 – 14 October 1919
- Country: United Kingdom
- Branch: British Army
- Type: Artillery
- Size: Battery
- Part of: North Midland Mounted Brigade; III Brigade, RHA (T.F.); XX Brigade, RHA (T.F.)
- peacetime HQ: Leicester
- Equipment: Ordnance QF 15-pounder Ordnance QF 18-pounder Ordnance QF 13-pounder
- Engagements: First World War Sinai and Palestine 1916-18 Battle of Romani Battle of Magdhaba Battle of Rafah First, Second and Third Battles of Gaza Battle of Mughar Ridge Battle of Nebi Samwil Battle of Jerusalem (1917) Second Transjordan Raid Battle of Megiddo (1918) Capture of Damascus (1918)

The Leicestershire Royal Horse Artillery was a Territorial Force Royal Horse Artillery battery that was formed in Leicestershire in 1908. It saw active service during the First World War in Egypt and Palestine from 1916 to 1918, initially with ANZAC Mounted Division before joining the Yeomanry Mounted Division and 1st Mounted / 4th Cavalry Division. A second line battery, 2/1st Leicestershire RHA, served on the Western Front with the 63rd (Royal Naval) Division from 1916 to 1918. Post-war, it was reconstituted as a Royal Field Artillery battery.

== History ==
=== Formation ===
The Territorial Force (TF) was formed on 1 April 1908 following the enactment of the Territorial and Reserve Forces Act 1907 (7 Edw.7, c.9) which combined and re-organised the old Volunteer Force, the Honourable Artillery Company and the Yeomanry. On formation, the TF contained 14 infantry divisions and 14 mounted yeomanry brigades. Each yeomanry brigade included a horse artillery battery and an ammunition column.

On 18 March 1908, Leicestershire Royal Horse Artillery (Territorial Force) was proposed as a new unit and it was recognized by the Army Council on 21 July 1908 (and the ammunition column on 29 July 1908). The unit consisted of

Battery HQ at No.1 Magazine Square, Leicester
Leicestershire Battery at Leicester
North Midland Mounted Brigade Ammunition Column also at Leicester

The battery was equipped with four Ehrhardt 15-pounder guns and allocated as artillery support to the North Midland Mounted Brigade.

=== First World War ===
In accordance with the Territorial and Reserve Forces Act 1907 (7 Edw.7, c.9) which brought the Territorial Force into being, the TF was intended to be a home defence force for service during wartime and members could not be compelled to serve outside the country. However, on the outbreak of war on 4 August 1914, many members volunteered for Imperial Service. Therefore, TF units were split into 1st Line (liable for overseas service) and 2nd Line (home service for those unable or unwilling to serve overseas) units. 2nd Line units performed the home defence role, although in fact most of these were also posted abroad in due course.

==== 1/1st Leicestershire ====
The battery was embodied with the North Midland Mounted Brigade and assigned to Third Army of the Central Force. It moved to Norfolk and joined 1st Mounted Division in September 1914 replacing the Nottinghamshire and Derbyshire Mounted Brigade. The brigade remained with 1st Mounted Division until October 1915 when it departed (as a mounted formation) for the Mediterranean. The battery remained in the United Kingdom attached to 2/1st North Midland Mounted Brigade, still with 1st Mounted Division. In February 1916 the battery (and its ammunition column) departed Southampton and disembarked at Alexandria in Egypt on 25 February.

Service with III Brigade

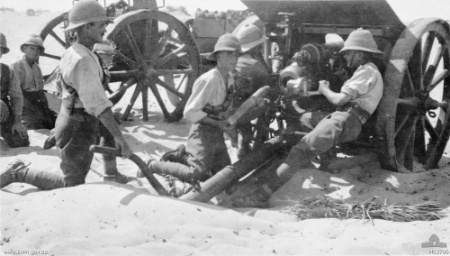
British artillerymen loading an 18 pounder gun at Romani in 1916

III Brigade, Royal Horse Artillery (T.F.) was formed in April 1916 in the Egyptian Expeditionary Force with the Somerset and Leicestershire Batteries, RHA. (Note: IV Brigade, Royal Horse Artillery (T.F.) was formed at the same time with Ayrshire Battery, RHA (T.F.) and Inverness-shire Battery, RHA (T.F.).) It was assigned to the ANZAC Mounted Division to provide artillery support. In practice, the batteries were permanently attached to the mounted brigades of the division and Leicestershire RHA joined the Australian 1st Light Horse Brigade.

The battery initially served with the ANZAC Mounted Division in the Sinai and Palestine Campaign. With the division, it saw action at the Battle of Romani (4 – 14 August 1916) as part of No. 3 Section, Suez Canal Defences. This saw the repulse of the final Turkish attempt to cut the Suez Canal.

The division then joined the Desert Column and with it took part in the advance across the Sinai. It fought at the Battle of Magdhaba (23 December 1916) and the Battle of Rafah (9 January 1917). The batteries were then re-equipped with four 18 pounders each before taking part in the First (26 – 27 March 1917) and Second Battles of Gaza (17 – 19 April 1917).

In June 1917, the Desert Column was reorganised from two mounted divisions of four brigades each (ANZAC and Imperial Mounted Divisions) to three mounted divisions of three brigades each (ANZAC, Australian – Imperial Mounted Division renamed – and the new Yeomanry Mounted Division). Consequently, the 22nd Mounted Brigade was transferred from the ANZAC to the Yeomanry Mounted Division on 6 July 1917. With a reduction to three brigades, there was a corresponding reduction in the artillery to three batteries. The Leicestershire Battery departed on 20 June to join XX Brigade, RHA (T.F.) in the Yeomanry Mounted Division. (Note: 22nd Mounted Brigade was originally the North Midland Mounted Brigade.)

Service with XX Brigade

Leicestershire, RHA (by now equipped with four 13 pounders) transferred from ANZAC Mounted Division on 20 June 1916 and joined XX Brigade RHA on 5 July 1917 where it joined the Hampshire and Berkshire Batteries. The battery remained with the division when it was restructured and indianized (Note: British divisions were converted to the British Indian Army standard whereby brigades only retained one British regiment or battalion and most support units were Indian (artillery excepted).) as the 1st Mounted Division (Note: Not to be confused with the original 1st Mounted Division formed in 1914; it never left the United Kingdom.) (from 24 April 1918) and later renamed as 4th Cavalry Division (23 July 1918).

During its time with the Yeomanry Mounted Division, the division served as part of the Egyptian Expeditionary Force in Palestine. From 31 October it took part in the Third Battle of Gaza, including the Battle of Beersheba (in GHQ Reserve) and the Capture of the Sheria Position under the Desert Mounted Corps (DMC). Still with the DMC, it took part in the Battle of Mughar Ridge on 13 and 14 November and the Battle of Nebi Samwil from 17 to 24 November. From 27 to 29 November, it withstood the Turkish counter-attacks during the Capture of Jerusalem.

Once the division was restructured and renamed, it served with the Desert Mounted Corps for the rest of the war, taking part in the Second Transjordan Raid (30 April to 4 May 1918) and the Final Offensive, in particular the Battle of Megiddo (19 to 25 September) and the Capture of Damascus (1 October).

The 4th Cavalry Division remained in Palestine on occupation duties after the end of the war. However, demobilization began immediately and most of the British war time units had left by May 1919. The Leicestershire Battery were reduced to cadre in Egypt on 14 October 1919.

==== 2/1st Leicestershire ====
2/1st Leicestershire RHA (T.F.)
- Active: 1915 – April 1919
- Country: United Kingdom
- Branch: British Army
- Type: Artillery
- Size: Battery
- Part of: 2/1st North Midland Mounted Brigade; CCCXVIII Brigade, RFA (T.F.); CCXXIII Brigade, RFA (T.F.)
- Equipment: Ordnance QF 15-pounder Ordnance QF 18-pounder
- Engagements: First World War Western Front Battle of the Ancre Battle of Arras (1917) Third Battle of Ypres First Battles of the Somme Battle of Albert (1918) Battle of Drocourt-Quéant Line Battle of the Canal du Nord Battle of Cambrai (1918)

Leicestershire RHA formed a 2nd line in 1915 and given a fractional designation as 2/1st Leicestershire Battery, RHA. It joined the 2/1st North Midland Mounted Brigade and with the brigade, joined 1st Mounted Division in October 1915 to replace the 1st line North Midland Mounted Brigade.

The pre-war Territorial Force infantry divisions were generally (Note: 51st (Highland) Division was exceptional in that it had three field and one mountain artillery brigade.) supported by four field artillery brigades. (Note: The basic organic unit of the Royal Artillery was, and is, the Battery. When grouped together they formed brigades, in the same way that infantry battalions or cavalry regiments were grouped together in brigades. At the outbreak of the First World War, a field artillery brigade of headquarters (4 officers, 37 other ranks), three batteries (5 and 193 each), and a brigade ammunition column (4 and 154) had a total strength just under 800 so was broadly comparable to an infantry battalion (just over 1,000) or a cavalry regiment (about 550). Like an infantry battalion, an artillery brigade was usually commanded by a Lieutenant-Colonel. Artillery brigades were redesignated as regiments in 1938. Note that the battery strength refers to a battery of six guns; a four-gun battery would be about two thirds of this.) These were numbered I, II, III and IV within each division and consisted of three gun brigades (each of three batteries, equipped with four 15-pounder guns) and a howitzer brigade (two batteries of four 5" howitzers). Artillery for 2nd Line divisions were formed in a similar manner, with a fractional designation, for example the artillery for the 63rd (2nd Northumberland) Division consisted of 2/I Northumberland Brigade, RFA (with 2/1st, 2/2nd and 2/3rd Northumberland Batteries, RFA), 2/II Northumberland Brigade, RFA (with 2/1st, 2/2nd and 2/3rd East Riding Batteries, RFA), 2/III Northumberland Brigade, RFA (with 2/1st, 2/2nd and 2/3rd Durham Batteries, RFA) and 2/IV Northumberland (Howitzer) Brigade, RFA (with 2/4th and 2/5th Durham (Howitzer) Batteries, RFA).

Between 8 and 22 May 1916, the artillery of 63rd (2nd Northumberland) Division was reorganized. The brigades were numbered (CCCXV, CCCXVI, CCCXVII, and CCCXVIII) and the batteries lettered (so 2/1st Northumberland Battery became A Battery, CCCXV Brigade). The howitzer batteries of CCCXVIII Brigade were transferred to CCCXV and CCCXVI brigades and the brigade was reformed with three gun batteries. 2/1st Leicestershire RHA joined as A Battery and 2/1st Somerset RHA as B Battery. The batteries each consisted of four 18 pounders.

On 2 July 1916, the 63rd (2nd Northumberland) Division's artillery left for France where it joined the Royal Naval Division. (Note: The 63rd (2nd Northumberland) Division was broken up on 21 July 1916 and the Royal Naval Division immediately adopted its number as 63rd (Royal Naval) Division.) On 18 July, A (Howitzer) Battery of XXCCIII Brigade (formerly 1/4th Kent (Howitzer) Battery of 1/IV Home Counties (Howitzer) Brigade) joined the brigade as D (Howitzer) Battery. With the breakup of XXCCIII Brigade, CCCXVIII Brigade was redesignated XXCCIII Brigade on 31 July. On 31 August, the batteries of the brigade were made up to 6 guns apiece and the battery now consisted of six 18 pounders.

The battery, and the brigade, served with 63rd (Royal Naval) Division for the rest of the war on the Western Front. With the division, it took part in the Battle of the Ancre (13 – 15 November 1916), Operations on the Ancre (20 January – 27 February 1917) and Battle of Miraumont (17 and 18 February). It then took part in the Battles of Arras, notably the Second Battle of the Scarpe (23 and 24 April) and the Battle of Arleux (28 and 29 April). At the end of 1917, it took part in the Third Battle of Ypres notably the Second Battle of Passchendaele (26 October – 5 November) and Welch Ridge (30 and 31 December).

In 1918, the division faced the German offensive in the First Battles of the Somme: Battle of St. Quentin (21 – 23 March), First Battle of Bapaume (24 and 25 March), and the Battle of the Ancre (5 April). Then followed the advance to victory: the Battle of Albert (21 – 23 August), Battle of Drocourt-Quéant Line (2 and 3 September), Battle of the Canal du Nord (27 September – 1 October), Battle of Cambrai and Capture of Niergnies (both on 8 October) and the Passage of the Grande Honnelle (7 November).

At the Armistice, the battery (six 18 pounders) was still with CCXXIII Brigade, RFA serving with 63rd (Royal Naval) Division. The division was not selected to form part of the Army of Occupation and by April 1919 it had been disbanded.

=== Post war ===
The Leicestershire RHA was not reconstituted until 7 February 1920 when it formed a battery (later numbered 239th) in 1st North Midland Brigade, RFA (later 60th (North Midland) Field Regiment, RA) and ceased to be a Royal Horse Artillery battery. The Nottinghamshire RHA also joined the brigade as 240th Battery. In 1938 these two batteries were detached from 60th (NM) Field Regiment (as it had become) to form a separate 115th (North Midland) Field Regiment, RA, which saw service in the Battle of France and Burma campaign in World War II. In 1950 it was amalgamated into 350 (South Notts Hussars Yeomanry) Heavy Regiment, RA.

== See also ==
- List of Territorial Force horse artillery batteries 1908

== Bibliography ==
- Becke, Archibald F. (1936). Order of Battle of Divisions Part 2A. The Territorial Force Mounted Divisions and the 1st-Line Territorial Force Divisions (42–56). London: HMSO. OCLC 4405016.
- Becke, Archibald F. (1937). Order of Battle of Divisions Part 2B. The 2nd-Line Territorial Force Divisions (57th–69th) with The Home-Service Divisions (71st–73rd) and 74th and 75th Divisions. London: HMSO. OCLC 4405016.
- Becke, Archibald F. (1945). Order of Battle of Divisions Part 3B. New Army Divisions (30-41) & 63rd (R.N.) Division. London: HMSO. OCLC 4405016.
- Clarke, Dale (2004). British Artillery 1914–19 Field Army Artillery. Vol. 94 of New Vanguard Series. Oxford: Osprey Publishing. ISBN 1-84176-688-7.
- Farndale, General Sir Martin (1988). The Forgotten Fronts and the Home Base, 1914–18. History of the Royal Regiment of Artillery. Woolwich: The Royal Artillery Institution. ISBN 1-870114-05-1.
- Frederick, J.B.M. (1984). Lineage Book of British Land Forces 1660–1978. Wakefield, Yorkshire: Microform Academic Publishers. ISBN 1-85117-009-X.
- Norman E.H. Litchfield, The Territorial Artillery 1908–1988 (Their Lineage, Uniforms and Badges), Nottingham: Sherwood Press, 1992, ISBN 0-9508205-2-0.
- Perry, F.W. (1992). Order of Battle of Divisions Part 5A. The Divisions of Australia, Canada and New Zealand and those in East Africa. Newport: Ray Westlake Military Books. ISBN 1-871167-25-6.
- Perry, F.W. (1993). Order of Battle of Divisions Part 5B. Indian Army Divisions. Newport: Ray Westlake Military Books. ISBN 1-871167-23-X.
- Rinaldi, Richard A (2008). Order of Battle of the British Army 1914. Ravi Rikhye. ISBN 978-0-97760728-0.
- Westlake, Ray (1992). British Territorial Units 1914–18. Osprey Publishing. ISBN 978-1-85532-168-7.
- Order of Battle of the British Armies in France, November 11th, 1918. France: General Staff, GHQ. 1918.
