= Second Battle of Amman =

World War I battle

Coordinates: 31°56′N 35°56′E

- Part of the Middle Eastern theatre of World War I
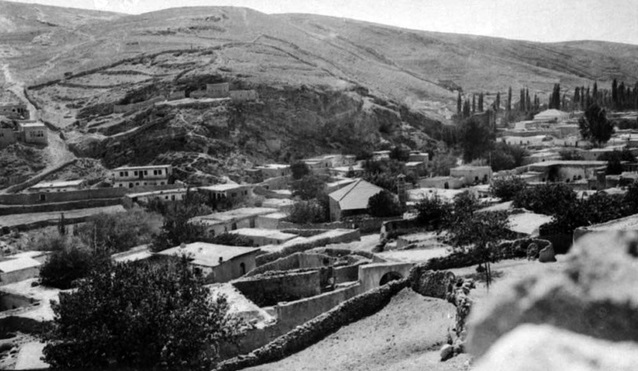
- View across Amman to the Citadel
Date	25 September 1918
Location	Amman, Syria Vilayet, Ottoman Empire
Result	Allied victory

Belligerents
British Empire: British India; Australia; New Zealand; British West Indies; Arab Revolt	Ottoman Empire; German Empire

Commanders and leaders
(United Kingdom of Great Britain and Ireland) Edmund Allenby (Dominion of New Zealand) Edward Chaytor	(German Empire) Otto Liman von Sanders (Ottoman Empire) Mohammed Jemal Pasha

Units involved
Chaytor's Force: Anzac Mounted Division; 20th Indian Brigade; 1st and 2nd Battalions British West Indies Regiment; 38th and 39th Battalions Royal Fusiliers	Fourth Army: II Corps; Hauran Detachment, Amman Division, Ma'an Detachment; VIII Corps; Caucasus Cavalry Brigade, 48th Division, Composite Division, Mule-mounted Infantry Regiment

The Second Battle of Amman was fought on 25 September 1918 during the Third Transjordan attack as part of the Battle of Nablus which together with the main Battle of Sharon form the major set piece offensive known as the Battle of Megiddo of the Sinai and Palestine Campaign in World War I. After cutting the road from Nablus to Es Salt on 22 September Chaytor's Force captured the bridge over the Jordan River at Jisr ed Damieh while units of the Seventh Army and remnants of the Eighth Army were still in retreating towards the bridge from the Judean Hills. Having cut this line of retreat, Chaytor's Force proceeded eastwards to attack and capture Es Salt, before riding on to attack and capture the Ottoman rearguard of the Fourth Army defending Amman. These British Empire victories of the Third Transjordan attack over Yildirim Army Group forces, followed two unsuccessful EEF attacks across the Jordan River in March and April 1918.

The Egyptian Expeditionary Force (EEF), commanded by General Edmund Allenby, began the Battle of Sharon in the early morning on the Mediterranean coast with attacks by the XXI Corps on the Eighth Ottoman Army followed by a breakthrough by the Desert Mounted Corps. Meanwhile, on their right the Battle of Nablus began with an attack by the XX Corps in the Judean Hills against the Asia Corps and sections of the Seventh Army defending Nablus, during the afternoon of 19 September once it became apparent the Battle of Sharon was succeeding, while Chaytor's Force held the extreme right flank in the Jordan Valley against the Fourth Ottoman Army and began their attacks northwards in the Jordan Valley to capture the Jisr ed Damieh bridge.

After leaving a detachment to hold the Jisr ed Damieh bridge and two other fords against any further retreating columns, Chaytor's Force advanced eastwards to attack and capture the garrisons at Shunet Nimrin and Es Salt. With the Fourth Army in retreat, they continued to Amman, where they attacked and captured a strong Ottoman rearguard of the Fourth Army's VIII Corps, which fought a determined action. Subsequently, Chaytor's Force accepted the surrender at Ziza of the Southern Force of the Fourth Army's II Corps, which had garrisoned the Hejaz Railway south from Amman to effectively end military operations in the area. Together these EEF victories during the Battle of Megiddo, resulted in the capture of the equivalent of one Ottoman army and many miles of territory, and forced the remnants of two armies to retreat in disarray.

== Background ==
The front line held by the Egyptian Expeditionary Force (EEF) commanded by General Edmund Allenby prior to the Battle of Megiddo on 19 September began at a point on the Mediterranean coast about twelve miles (19 km) north of Jaffa, to the north of Arsuf, ran about fifteen miles (24 km) south east across the Plain of Sharon, then east over the Judean Hills for about another fifteen miles (24 km), then continuing on for about eighteen miles (29 km) to the Dead Sea. From the Mediterranean coast, the front line rose from sea level to a height of 1,500–2,000 feet (460–610 m) in the Judean Hills before falling to 1,000 feet (300 m) below sea-level in the Jordan Valley. Chaytor's Force held the right flank from their junction with the XX Corps in the Judean Hills eight miles (13 km) north west of Jericho, across the Jordan Valley, and then southwards through the Ghoraniye and Auja bridgeheads to the Dead Sea. This area garrisoned by Chaytor's Force was overlooked by well sighted Ottoman long range guns.

=== Amman ===
Also called Rabbath Ammon by the Ammonites and Philadelphia when it was one of the Decapolis's ten cities during Roman rule, Amman, with its fine Roman ruins including an amphitheatre, lies "cupped in hills." A citadel on a hill covered the northern and western approaches to the city while east was the Hejaz railway, turntable and railway station two miles (3.2 km) from the city along the Wadi Amman. To the south of the station was a ten arched viaduct and 462 feet (141 m) long railway tunnel.

All of the supplies and reinforcements for the Ottoman Fourth Army force which had faced the EEF garrison occupying the Jordan Valley came through Amman. Now the Hejaz railway was the main line of retreat for the Fourth Army, for the Amman and Ma'an garrisons and the southern Hejaz railway garrison.

== Prelude ==
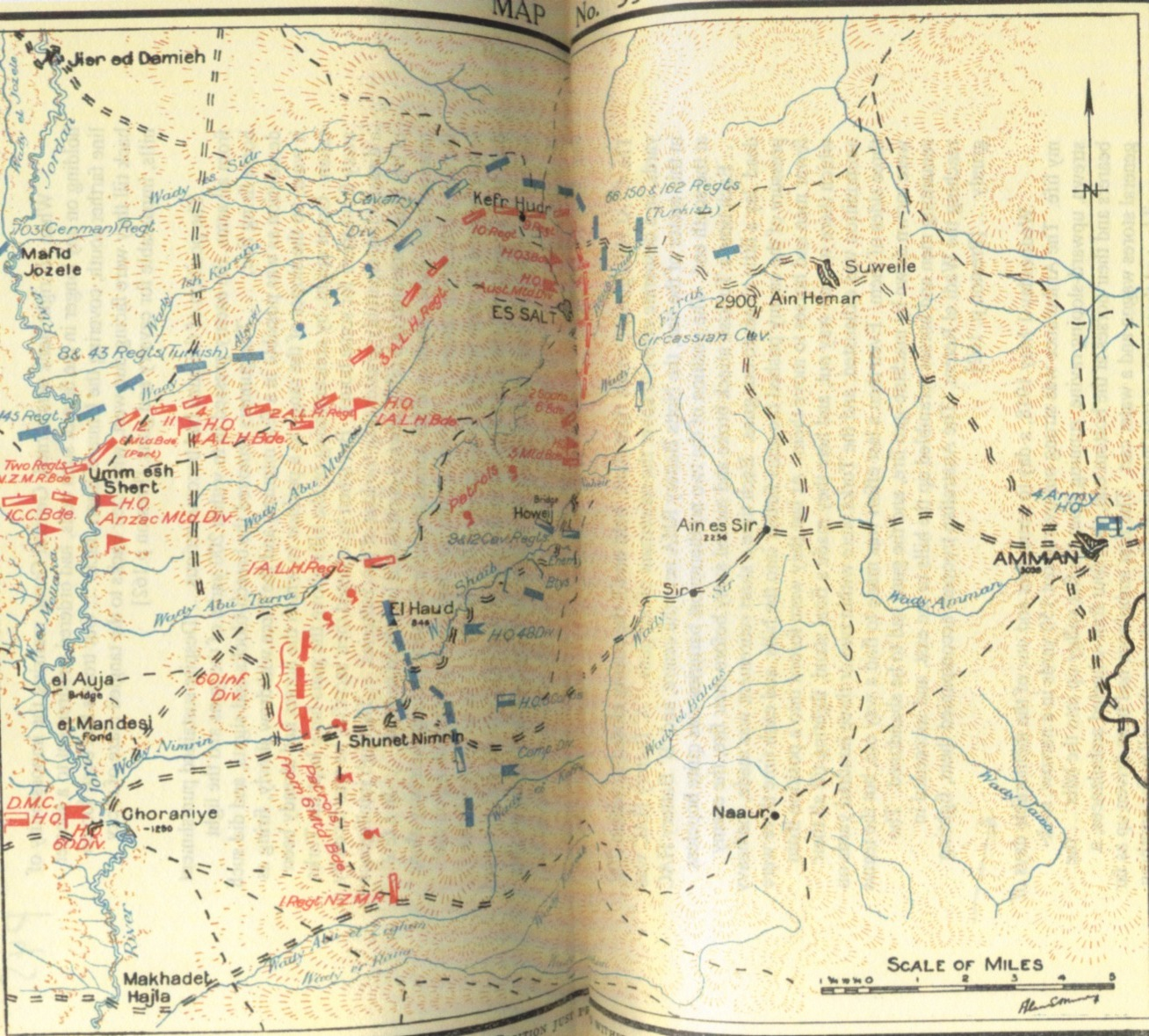
Gullett's Map 35 shows positions on 2 May 1918 during the Second Transjordan attack, also shows the Naaur and Ain es Sir tracks to Amman

While the initial attacks by the XXI Corps, the breakthrough by the Desert Mounted Corps, and the subsequent XX Corps attack were under way, it was necessary to deploy a force strong enough to defend their right flank in the Jordan Valley against any attack by the Fourth Army, which covered the EEF occupied Jordan Valley area with long range guns located in the eastern foothills.

=== Ottoman Fourth Army ===
The Fourth Army consisting of 6,000 infantry and 2,000 cavalry supported by seventy-four artillery pieces was commanded by General Mohammed Jemal Pasha. (Note: The commander has also been referred to as Cemal, [Erickson 2001 p. 196] Cemal Kucjuk Pasha [Kinloch 2007 p. 303] and Djemal the Lesser. [Bruce 2002 p. 236] [Carver 2003 p. 232]) The army headquarters was at Amman, and held the line across the Jordan Valley and southwards along the Hejaz railway. (Note: The Fourth Army had been based at Es Salt during the Second Transjordan attacks at the end of April, having moved forward from Amman after the First Transjordan attack on Amman in March.[Keogh 1955, p. 219]) The Fourth Army was composed of the VIII Corps' 48th Infantry Division, the Composite Division of a German battalion group, (Note: This Composite Division of a group of German battalions is not identified in any more detail by any of the sources quoted.) the Caucasus Cavalry Brigade, the division sized Serstal Group, the 24th and 62nd Infantry Divisions and a mule-mounted infantry regiment. The 3rd Cavalry Division, German 146th Regiment 63rd Regiment made up the Army Troops. There were 6,000 Ottoman soldiers with 30 guns in the II Corps, known as the Seria Group or Jordan Group, which garrisoned the Hejaz railway line from Ma'an southwards towards Mecca.

=== Chaytor's Force ===
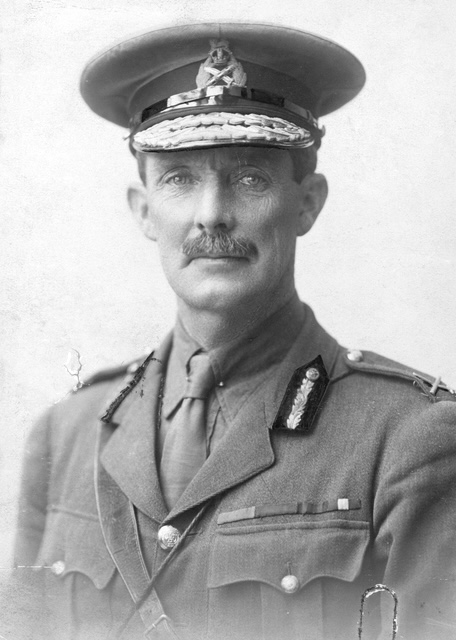
Sir Edward Chaytor

This composite force commanded by Major General Edward Chaytor was "nearly equivalent to two divisions," being a reinforced mounted infantry division of 11,000 men.

Chaytor's Force consisted of the ANZAC Mounted Division's

1st Light Horse Brigade commanded by Brigadier General C. F. Cox
2nd Light Horse Brigade commanded by Brigadier General G. de L. Ryrie (Note: less 1 squadron of 2nd Light Horse Brigade with Desert Mounted Corps. [Falls 1930 Vol. 2 p. 593])
New Zealand Mounted Rifles Brigade commanded by Brigadier General W. Meldrum

the 20th Indian Brigade commanded by Brigadier General E. R. B. Murray

110th Mahratta Light Infantry
Alwar Imperial Service Infantry
Patiala Imperial Service Infantry
Gwalior Imperial Service Infantry

the 1st and 2nd Battalions British West Indies Regiment, the 38th and 39th Battalions Royal Fusiliers, the 86th/26th Machine Gun Squadron and artillery. (Note: The two battalions of fusiliers had been recruited from England, America and the Middle East. [Bruce 2002 p. 205])

The ration strength of Chaytor's Force at the end of operations on 30 September was "8,000 British, 3,000 Indian, 500 Egyptian Camel Transport Corps troops."

==== Jordan Valley deployments ====
Chaytor took command of the Jordan Valley garrison on 5 September 1918. The right sector was held by the 2nd Light Horse Brigade and the 20th Indian Brigade while the left sector held by the New Zealand Mounted Rifles Brigade, the 38th Battalion Royal Fusiliers, and the 1st and 2nd Battalions British West Indies Regiment supported by a field artillery battery and an Indian mountain battery. The 39th Royal Fusiliers formed the sector reserve, while the 1st Light Horse Brigade was in Force reserve.

Lieutenant General Harry Chauvel, the Australian commander of the Desert Mounted Corps, instructed Chaytor to hold his ground "for the present", but to closely watch the Ottoman forces during around-the-clock patrolling, and to immediately occupy any abandoned enemy positions. As soon as possible Chaytor's Force was to advance northwards to capture and cut a main line of withdrawal for the Ottoman Seventh and Eighth Armies across the Damieh bridge, also a main line of communication between these two armies west of the River Jordan in the Judean Hills with the Fourth Army in the east. By 21 September, only the Fourth Army remained in position and intact after the successful attacks during the Battle of Sharon by the XXI Corps, the Desert Mounted Corps and the beginning of the Battle of Nablus by XX Corps. The destruction of the Fourth Army, which had begun to withdraw to conform with the two other Ottoman armies in the Judean Hills, became Allenby's next priority. Chaytor's Force was to advance eastwards to capture Es Salt and Amman, and to intercept and capture the 4,600-strong southern Hejaz garrison.

==== Advance northwards ====
After the British West Indies Regiment advances towards Bakr Ridge were consolidated and continued at dawn on 20 September, their 2nd Battalion captured Bakr Ridge along with Baghalat and Chalk Ridge. Although the 38th Battalion Royal Fusiliers was opposed at Mellaha the 2nd Light Horse Brigade and Patiala Infantry, advanced eastwards across the Jordan Valley toward the strongly entrenched Shunet Nimrin position, and Derbasi on the Ottoman left flank although positions east of the Jordan River continued to be strongly held.

The Seventh and Fourth Armies had begun to withdraw, and before dawn on 21 September Chaytor ordered the Auckland Mounted Rifles Regiment to advance and capture Kh Fasail, two miles (3.2 km) north of Baghalat and about halfway to Damieh, which they had captured by 23:30. The Nablus to Damieh road was captured early in the morning of 22 September by Meldrum's Force which included the New Zealand Mounted Rifles Brigade and the British West Indies Regiment. (Note: This was the second time that a commander of the Ottoman 53rd Division had been captured by the New Zealanders. The first happened during the First Battle of Gaza in March 1917. [Falls 1930 Vol. 2 p. 551] [Hill 1978 p. 173]) Subsequently, an attack on the Ottoman garrison holding the bridge at Damieh by the Auckland and Canterbury Mounted Rifles Regiments supported by a battalion of the British West Indies Regiment forced the defenders to retreat in disorder, when the bridge was captured intact.

The 2nd Battalion British West Indies Regiment, reinforced by the 3rd Light Horse Regiment (1st Light Horse Brigade), captured the Ottoman rearguard covering the Mafid Jozele ford, despite having encountered a number of Ottoman soldiers withdrawing across the ford. Mafid Jozele was captured by 05:50 on 23 September, but the bridge had been destroyed at the ford.

The EEF became aware of the withdrawal of the Fourth Army at 23:35 on 22/23 September, when orders were issued for an attack on Shunet Nimrin, Kabr Mujahid and Tel er Ramr. This was to be carried out by the 2nd Light Horse Brigade and mobile sections of the 20th Indian Brigade, a group that consisted of 1,500 rifles, three sections of machine guns and forty Lewis guns. This force was to move eastwards along the main Ghoranyeh to Es Salt road towards Shunet Nimrin, while the immobile section was to remain in defence in the right sector of the Jordan Valley occupied zone. The CRA was to support this advance by targeting Shunet Nimrin.

==== Advance eastwards to Es Salt and Amman ====
Before Haifa was captured by the 14th Cavalry Brigade (5th Cavalry Division) on 23 September, Chaytor's Force had crossed the Jordan River to climb to the Plateau of Moab and Gilead on their way to capture Es Salt. An extensive rearguard position, defended by nine officers and 150 other ranks with rifles and machine guns, across the road from Damieh to Es Salt had been attacked and outflanked by the Canterbury Mounted Rifles Regiment advance guard. All defenders were captured, and at 16:20 on 23 September, Es Salt was occupied by the New Zealand Mounted Rifles Brigade.

The 2nd Light Horse Brigade was delayed by the difficult track up the Wadis Jeri'a and Sir which did not reach Ain Hummar on the main road five miles (8.0 km) east of Es Salt until the afternoon of 24 September. The main road had been blown up in places by the retreating Ottoman Army, forcing Chaytor to pause on 24 September to wait for supplies as well. During the day the New Zealand Mounted Rifles Brigade occupied Suweile and one hundred men from the Auckland Mounted Rifles Regiment took 11 hours to ride twenty miles (32 km), cut the railway five miles (8.0 km) north of Amman and return to Suweile. Accompanied by four officers, the raiding group carrying nothing but tools and weapons, advanced twelve miles (19 km) to the railway, where they took out a section of the Hedjaz line five miles (8.0 km) north of Amman near Kalaat ez Zerka station. (Note: One source describes the raid taking place during the night of 23/24 September. [Powles 1922 pp. 249–50])

Orders were then issued for the New Zealand Mounted Rifles and the 2nd Light Horse Brigades to advance to Amman beginning at 06:00 on 25 September. The 1st Light Horse Brigade was to follow at 06:30, while the 1st Battalion British West Indies Regiment would march to Suweileh to replace the New Zealand Mounted Rifles Brigade garrison by 07:00. If the attackers found Amman was lightly held, they were to strongly assault the place, but if Amman was held in strength the assault on the city was to be deferred until the infantry arrived; only the outlying or forward trenches were to be attacked while artillery was to bombard the place, and all lines of retreat northwards were to be cut. Aerial bombing of Amman was requested.

== Battle ==
Transjordan theatre of operations 21 March to 2 April; 30 April to 4 May and 20 to 29 September. Detail shows advance to Amman

The defences at Amman had been greatly strengthened since the First Transjordan attack on Amman in March 1918, by the construction of a series of redoubts that were reinforced by machine guns. In addition, "the natural difficulties of the broken country made Amman a very hard nut to crack." The area's boggy ground had limited movement during the first attack in March, but by the early autumn the approach had become hard, and favoured rapid mounted attack.

Chaytor's mounted rifle and light horse brigades began their advance on Amman at 06:00 on 25 September; the New Zealand Mounted Rifle Brigade from Suweileh in the north west, with their right on the main Es Salt to Amman road, the 2nd Light Horse Brigade from Ain es Sir in the west, along the Amman road with their left flank guarded by the 1st Light Horse Brigade, in reserve. Divisional headquarters was quickly established at 07:45 on Hill 3040 near Amman and by 08:30 the New Zealand Mounted Rifles Brigade were attacking two hundred Ottoman soldiers armed with rifles and machine guns, holding a ridge to the north west of Amman. Movement was observed on Hill 3039 on the other side of Amman. Two batteries of small guns and a number of machine guns deployed in several Ottoman rearguard posts four miles (6.4 km) from the Amman delayed the 2nd Light Horse Brigade which eventually captured 106 prisoners and four machine guns after vigorous fighting.

The Wellington Mounted Rifles Regiment, with one section of machine guns and one section of the 29th Indian Mountain Battery attached, leading the New Zealand Mounted Rifles Brigade (commanded by Meldrum) came under machine gun and artillery fire and were fully engaged when, at 09:00 the 2nd Light Horse Brigade came up on their right and one regiment of the 1st Light Horse Brigade, sent at 10:00 to reinforce the left flank of the New Zealand Mounted Rifles Brigade, came under Meldrum's command. The Auckland Mounted Rifles Regiment was able to advance half an hour later, on the right of the Wellington Mounted Rifles Regiment, with the 2nd Light Horse Brigade on their left and the New Zealand Mounted Rifles Brigade reported at 11:10 that they were ready to gallop part of the defences, but the only way forward was between two hills strongly defended by machine guns. Both brigades continued to press the attack on these Ottoman advance posts, closely supported by their mountain guns eventually forcing the Ottoman soldiers in these advanced posts to retire back to their main line of defence, which was also strongly supported by machine guns.

The 1st Light Horse Brigade ordered its 1st Light Horse Regiment to circle round the left flank of the New Zealand Mounted Rifles Brigade and advance towards the railway, while a squadron of the 7th Light Horse Regiment (2nd Light Horse Brigade) captured some Ottoman sangars on the right of the leading regiment, the 5th Light Horse Regiment (2nd Light Horse Brigade). At noon the Canterbury Mounted Rifles Regiment advanced mounted towards Amman, but they were stopped by fire from concealed machine guns on the Citadel. Meanwhile, fighting in the streets by the Auckland Mounted Rifles Regiment was progressing by 13:30, and the leading regiment of the 2nd Light Horse Brigade; the 5th Light Horse Regiment had entered the southern part of the town. At 14:30, a second regiment of 1st Light Horse Brigade was ordered to reinforce the New Zealand Mounted Rifles Brigade's left.

The Canterbury Mounted Rifles Regiment dismounted to continue their attack on the Citadel with the bayonet. By 15:17 the "enemy's resistance was collapsing," when the Canterbury Mounted Rifles Regiment captured the Citadel, 119 prisoners and six machine guns. They had advanced to a position "from which they enfiladed the Turks in the Citadel," and shortly afterwards the 10th Squadron, with a troop of the 8th Squadron, attacked and captured the Citadel, while the 5th Light Horse Regiment was "hunting out snipers and capturing prisoners," and the Auckland and Wellington Mounted Rifles Regiments continued their advance towards the Wadi Amman, where they were reinforced by the Canterbury Mounted Rifles Regiment, who had advanced through the town centre. At the Wadi Amman, 1,700 prisoners surrendered. The railway station was captured at 16:39, along with many more prisoners, a wireless station, and great quantities of stores and war material. The attacking force's systematic methods of "galloping to points of vantage and bringing fire to bear on the flanks of such machine gun nests", combined with quick outflanking of machine guns eventually won all obstacles, and broke the opposition.

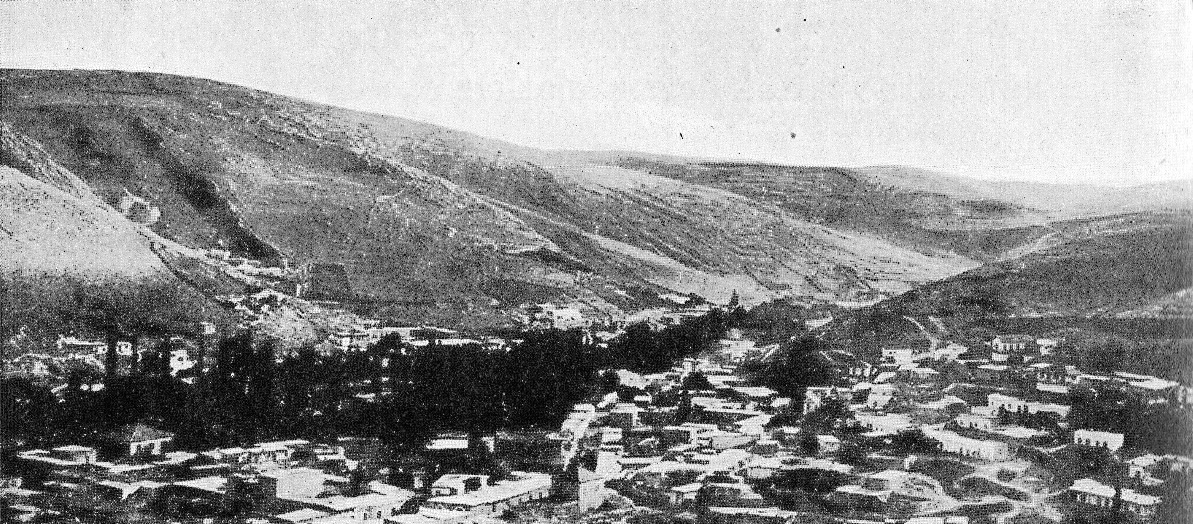
Amman in foreground, Hill 3039 behind

With Amman captured, the 2nd Light Horse Brigade continued its advance east of the Citadel, across the Wadi Amman, and up on to Hill 3039, which they occupied. (Note: Hill 3039 had been captured and held, and then relinquished at great cost, during the First Transjordan attack on Amman at the end of March 1918.[Powles 1922 p. 252]) The 1st Light Horse Brigade meanwhile advanced along the railway to the north of Amman and captured several guns and hundreds of prisoners who were attempting to retreat. A squadron from the Auckland Mounted Rifles Regiment was sent to Madaba, where they captured a number of prisoners and a very large amount of grain and emergency rations for the men were supplemented by food bought from the inhabitants.

Chaytor's Force suffered 139 casualties: twenty-seven killed, seven missing and 105 wounded in battle. Of these the ANZAC Mounted Division suffered sixteen men killed and fifty-six wounded, while the 2nd Battalion British West Indies Regiment suffered forty-one casualties. There were 10,322 prisoners, fifty-seven guns and 147 machine guns captured. The ANZAC Mounted Division had captured Amman and 2,500-2,563 prisoners, three hundred sick, ten guns, of which three were heavy, and twenty-five machine guns. The 1st Light Horse Brigade held the Amman railway station area, the New Zealand Mounted Rifles Brigade held the area to the south, and the 2nd Light Horse Brigade bivouacked on the western slope of Hill 3039. The 20th Indian Brigade, along with the 18th Royal Horse Artillery Brigade and 1st Battalion British West Indies Regiment, were ordered to march to Amman. The 39th Royal Fusiliers were left at Suweileh to take over the occupation of Es Salt. The 38th and 39th Battalions Royal Fusiliers under the command of Lieutenant Colonel Patterson, had concentrated at the Auja bridgehead ready to follow the 20th Indian Brigade to Shunet Nimrin.

== Aftermath ==
Only the rearguard of the Ottoman Fourth Army was captured at Amman. The remainder of the garrison had already withdrawn northwards, following orders received from Liman von Sanders on 21 September, four days before Chaytor's attack.

A Fourth Army column seen at Mafrak, north of Amman in the early morning of 25 September was bombed by Australian aircraft which also destroyed the railway station, a long train and several dumps, blocking the line. The survivors were forced to abandon their wheeled-transport, and only a few thousand managed to escape on foot or horse towards Deraa and Damascus. Two days later, aircraft directed the 1st Light Horse Brigade to the location of the Ottoman force on 27 September, and then machine gunned the enemy, when the successful attack by the light horsemen captured three hundred prisoners and two machine guns. By evening, the light horse brigade held the water at Wadi el Hamman, while one regiment occupied Kalaat ez Zerka.

Meanwhile, Chaytor's Force at Amman, blocked the road and railway, and prepared to intercept the withdrawing Ottoman II Corps of the Fourth Army, also known as Southern Force, retreating north from Ma'an. This large Ottoman force which had garrisoned the towns and railway stations on the southern Hejaz Railway, was reported to be thirty miles (48 km) south of Amman on the evening of 25 September, advancing quickly north towards Chaytor's Force. The 5th Light Horse Regiment meanwhile had reached three miles (4.8 km) north of Ziza at 10:30, on 28 September where the Ottoman II Corps surrendered.

Chaytor's Force's total captures from the beginning of operations to 30 September were 10,322 prisoners, fifty-seven guns, including one 5.9 gun, three 5.9 howitzers, one anti-aircraft gun, ten 10 cm guns, thirty-two 77 mm guns, six 75 mm guns, two 3-inch guns and two 13-pounder HAC guns, 147 machine guns, thirteen automatic rifles, including one Hotchkiss rifle and one Lewis gun, two wireless sets, eleven railway engines, 106 railway rolling stock, 142 vehicles and large quantities of artillery shells, small arms ammunition and other material.

== Notes ==
Footnotes

Citations
