= Battle of Abu Tellul =

1918 battle in Palestine

- Part of the Middle Eastern theatre of World War I
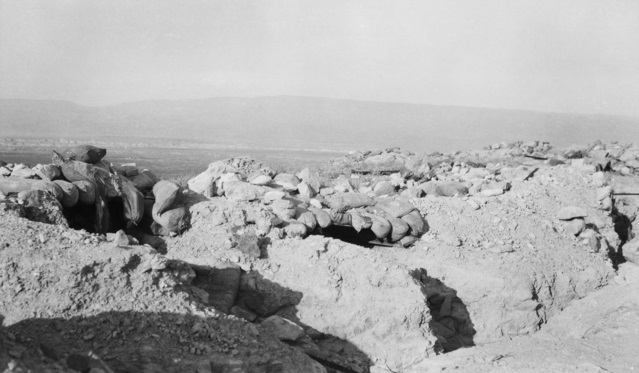
- Turkish defences at Abu Tellul
Date	14 July 1918
Location	Palestine
Result	British Empire victory

Belligerents
United Kingdom and Empire: India; Australia	German Empire; Ottoman Empire

Commanders and leaders
(British Empire) H. J. M. Macandrew (Australia) Charles Cox (British Empire) Cyril Rodney Harbord	

Strength
15th (Imperial Service) Cavalry Brigade; 1st Light Horse Brigade; B Battery, Honourable Artillery Company	Ottoman 24th Division (supported by two German battalions)

Casualties and losses
189 including 23 killed, 46 wounded Australian Light Horsemen	About 1,000; 105 killed, 45 wounded, 425–540 captured

The Battle of Abu Tellul (called the Affair of Abu Tellul by the British Battles Nomenclature Committee) was fought on 14 July 1918 during the Sinai and Palestine Campaign of World War I after German and Ottoman Empire forces attacked the British Empire garrison in the Jordan Valley. The valley had been occupied by the Egyptian Expeditionary Force (EEF) from February 1918 when Jericho was captured. Following two raids east of the River Jordan by the EEF the first in March and second in April the defence of the valley became the responsibility of the Desert Mounted Corps.

A German and Ottoman force attacked the Australian Light Horse units defending the heights at Mussallabeh and Abu Tellul on the edge of the Judean Hills, while a German force attacked those defending the Wadi Mellaha midway between Abu Tellul and the Jordan River. As these attacks were taking place on the western bank of the river, on the eastern side the Ottoman Caucasus Cavalry Brigade deployed two regiments, to attack the bridgeheads at the fords of El Hinu and Makhadet Hijla. However, the Ottoman formation was overwhelmed by a combined force of British and Indian troops before it could launch its attack. These were the last attacks against the British forces in this campaign.

== Background ==
=== Military situation ===
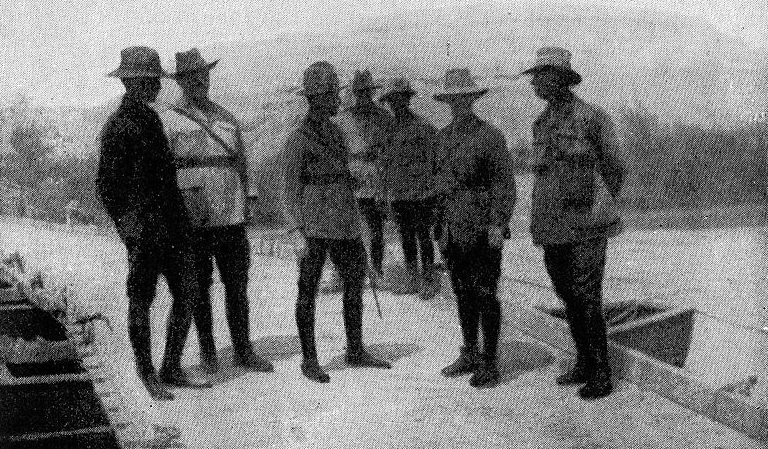
A conference of brigade and divisional commanders with their corps commander on a pontoon bridge spanning the Jordan River. From left to right: Generals Meldrum (New Zealand Mounted Rifles), Ryrie (2nd Light Horse), Chauvel (Desert Mounted Corps), Chaytor (Anzac Mounted Division) and Cox (1st Light Horse).

Abu Tellul was a strategically important ridge located near the west bank of the Jordan river which, together with another ridge to the north called Mussallabeh, formed a salient in the British defensive line in the Jordan valley. A number of defensive posts were constructed by the Australian and New Zealand garrison which were often between 400 yards (370 m) and 1,000 yards (910 m) apart, consisting of either dug or built up stone sangars, while the ravines in between were covered with barbed wire. The British artillery batteries were concealed close behind the front line just south of the ridge.

El Mussallabeh had been attacked on 11 April, between the first and second Transjordan raids. The attack had been launched by a composite force of four Ottoman infantry battalions and several batteries. Subsequently, defensive work was carried out. From early May, when the withdrawal of the forces involved in the second Transjordan attack was complete, the occupation of the Jordan Valley by the Egyptian Expeditionary Force was unchallenged, except for the attacks on 14 July and shelling by long-range Ottoman and German artillery.

The Ottoman and German attack occurred on the front line protecting the garrison in the valley; the main focus being a salient in the wilderness to the north north west of the Wadi el Auja on the western side of the Jordan River. They sought to cut off the British force in the Jordan Valley from the infantry holding the front line in the Judean Hills by creating a wedge between the infantry and the mounted force in the valley. Such an action would, if successful, have destabilised British control of the Jordan and Dead Sea area, effectively ending the threat of a third Transjordan attack by pushing Lieutenant General Harry Chauvel's forces back out of the Jordan Valley. If the attack succeeded, the front line stretching from the Mediterranean Sea would have been considerably shortened and potentially destabilised. The Ottoman Eighth Army defending the coastal sector, the Seventh Army defending the Judean Hills and the Fourth Army defending the east would have been able to strengthen their considerably shorter line to threaten General Edmund Allenby's right flank making the attacks in September at Megiddo very difficult, if not virtually impossible.

=== Deterioration of German–Ottoman relations ===
Bad feelings between the two allies arose when it was believed by sections of the Ottoman Army in Palestine that some German units had been withdrawn and sent to the Caucasus. In fact, no units of the Ottoman Army were withdrawn from Palestine to support the Trans-Caucasian campaigns, one infantry division and an infantry regiment were sent to eastern Anatolia in 1918 but from Constantinople. Indeed, considerable reinforcements arrived in Palestine from Caucasia in 1918 including the 2nd Caucasian Cavalry Division and the 37th Division. The cordial relations developed between Ottomans and Germans during three years of war in the Sinai and Palestine were, however, seriously undermined in May 1918 when Enver Pasha violated the Treaty of Brest-Litovsk and aggressively expanded the Ottoman presence in Georgia.

== Prelude ==
Falls' Sketch Map 28 shows the positions of the 1st Light Horse Brigade at Mussallabeh and Abu Tellul

=== Attacking force ===
The force consisted of the German 702nd and 703rd Battalions with one battalion of the 146th Regiment, the Ottoman 24th and 53rd Divisions, one company of the 11th Jäger Regiment (German light infantry), the Ottoman Caucasus Cavalry Brigade's 2nd (not engaged), the Ottoman 32nd, 58th and 163rd Regiments and two regiments of 3rd Cavalry Division. Included in this force was a group of 100 Germans who were armed with 42 automatic rifles.

=== Defending force ===
The Abu Tellul sector was held by two regiments of the 1st Light Horse Brigade; the 2nd Light Horse Regiment held four posts; "Mussallabeh", "Maskera" "The Bluff" and "Vyse" while the 3rd Light Horse Regiment held the "Vale", "View", "Vaux", "Zoo" and "Zeiss" posts which surrounded the high plateau of Abu Tellul where the "Abu Tellul East" and "Abu Tellul West" posts were separated by a gully. Before the attacks began, the commander of the 3rd Light Horse Regiment was asked if he thought the front line could stop a determined attack at Abu Tellul –

No, they are bound to come through [but] The posts will stand, unless they are withdrawn for tactical reasons or completely destroyed.

The 1st Light Horse Regiment formed the brigade reserve. The defence of these Mussallabeh and Abu Tellul positions was supported by the 1/1st Nottinghamshire Royal Horse Artillery (RHA), 1/B Battery, Honourable Artillery Company (HAC), C/301 and C/303 Howitzer Batteries (60th (2/2nd London) Division), the 11th Mountain Battery and the Hong Kong Mountain Battery. The British artillery in the sector between the river and the villages of Abu Tellul and Mussallabeh were the 11th Mountain Battery, Royal Garrison Artillery and Hong Kong and Singapore Mountain Battery of the 10th (Irish) Division. These and other British artillery stationed south of the river also took part in supporting the Australian Light Horse counter-attack, which regained all that had initially been lost before the day's end. Hard close quarter fighting earned battle distinctions for Captain Boyd, Lieutenant Macansh and Second Lieutenant Byrnes.

The 2nd Light Horse Brigade held the Wadi Mellaha which flowed from the north, southwards into the Wadi el Auja, some 3,000 yards (2,700 m) to the east; approximately halfway between the Abu Tellul – Mussallabeh positions and the Jordan River. The 4th Light Horse Brigade formed part of corps reserve south of the Auja while the New Zealand Mounted Rifles Brigade, armed with one Hotchkiss machine-gun for every thirty-five men, was in divisional reserve 6 miles (9.7 km) south of Mussallabeh on the Wadi Nueiameh.

The fords on the Jordan River at Makhadet Hijla and El Hinu were held by the Mysore and Hyderabad Lancers, while the Ghoraniyeh bridgehead was garrisoned by the Alwar and Patiala Infantry Battalions and the 14th and 15th (Imperial Service) Cavalry Brigades of the 2nd Mounted Division. Riding out to attack the massing Ottoman cavalry were the Jodhpur and Mysore Lancers, from the 15th (Imperial Service) Cavalry Brigade, the Poona Horse and the Sherwood Rangers Yeomanry from the 14th Cavalry Brigade. (Note: See Falls' Sketch Map 29) By June work was continuing on the defences and the men worked hard to complete sangars, digging and wiring although the area was overlooked by the Ottomans and much of the work had to be done at night. Early in July the 1st Light Horse Regiment was in reserve while the 2nd and 3rd Light Horse Regiment held Vyse and Zeiss posts.

On 13 July the section of the front line which passed through the Jordan Valley to the Dead Sea was commanded by Chauvel's Desert Mounted Corps. The Ghoraniyeh bridgehead and the area of the valley stretching south towards the Dead Sea was held by the 2nd Mounted Division with two Indian infantry battalions (Alwar Infantry (I.S.) and 1st Battalion, Patiala Infantry (I.S.) of 20th Indian Brigade). While the Australian and New Zealand Mounted Division (ANZAC Mounted Division) held the Auja and Mellaha areas including the Abu Tellul salient. This salient was difficult to defend, as the posts and sangars were isolated owing to the hilly terrain interspersed by rocky crevasses. Under orders, a series of posts and sangars were constructed at Abu Tellul and Mussallabeh which were designed for all-round defence. Work to strengthen these defences included heavily wiring all the posts which were kept supplied with water, ammunition and food.

After a few relatively cool days, around 7 August the temperature began to rise steadily and it was noticed that the Ottoman forces had increased their activities, in particular the shelling of Abu Tellul had greatly increased. On 14 July the maximum shade temperature was recorded at 115 °F (46 °C).

== Battle ==
The attack commenced with long-range artillery shelling from both sides throughout the night, then 17 German aircraft bombed the Jordan Valley garrison at 04:00 in the morning of Sunday 14 July, causing dozens of casualties.

=== Attack on the Abu Tellul and Mussallebeh salient ===
Detail of Falls Sketch Map 28 showing attacks on 1st Light Horse Brigade at Mussallabeh and Abu Tellul

Movements were heard between Vale and View posts defended by the 3rd Light Horse Regiment just after 01:00 when the regimental commander ordered an artillery barrage in front of Vale post. Ottoman artillery also started shelling Mussallabeh and Abu Tellul. This bombardment ceased about 02:30 when the movement of many Ottoman units was again heard by the defenders. These were the German 702nd and 703rd Battalions, one company of the 11 Regiment Jäger Battalion and one company of the 146th Regiment. This force was supported on the left by the 32nd Regiment attacking Mussallabeh, and on the right by the 163rd and 58th Regiments facing Abu Tellul, with 2nd Regiment forming a reserve in the rear. (Note: The Ottoman 32nd and 58th Regiments had, on 1 May, three months before strongly attacked the 4th Light Horse Brigade south of Jisr ed Damieh during the Second Transjordan attack on Shunet Nimrin and Es Salt (1918) and forced the brigade to retreat. [Falls 1930 Vol. 2 Part II p. 438])

At 03:30 the Mussallabeh salient protecting the Wadi el Auja was attacked by 1,250 Germans in two and a half battalions. Just before the attack began, the regimental commander of 2nd Light Horse Regiment withdrew his headquarters, located just behind Vale position, which was the first position attacked, narrowly escaping capture to Abu Tellul West where they established and maintained their position throughout the attack. The 2nd Light Horse regimental commanding officer observed from his new position on Abu Tellul West, just before dawn, a large body of troops coming up the hill towards his twelve-man post. At first he assumed they were some of his own men retiring from the outer posts, but when they reached the wire and began to cut it, he at once gave the order to open rapid fire.

The German battalions forming the centre of the attacking force made a considerable advance circling over the Vale position and across Abu Tellul; establishing a post on Abu Tellul East and then pushing on to eastern side; to The Bluff where they occupied a post with their backs to Kh al Beiyudak. This move cut off all the Light Horse posts at Vyse and on Mussallabeh as well as those on The Bluff and Abu Tellul East, all were without communication to regimental or brigade headquarters. Despite being isolated, heavily attacked and in a number of cases surrounded, they held their ground. They were able to successfully defend their sangars and posts from whatever direction the attack came. Only the troop at Vale and Maskera posts were forced to retire, while one trench on Mussallabeh was captured for a short period before being retaken, and one sangar on Abu Tellul East held by a troop of the 2nd Light Horse Regiment was captured after all the garrison was killed or wounded.

The Germans found themselves caught in numerous cross fires from the front, flank and rear from the mutually-supporting defensive positions, while the Ottoman forces deployed on their left and right flanks were unable to strongly support the German attack. On the left of the main attack the Ottoman 32nd Regiment made a frontal attack on Mussallabeh and captured a post, which was retaken by the defenders shortly after. Three attempts were made by the left of the attacking force on Mussallabeh, but were driven back each time with heavy loss by well placed machine-gun fire leaving about 200 dead. The whole position was completely restored and 380 German and about 200 Ottoman prisoners were sent back to headquarters. On the right flank, Ottoman units from the Ottoman 58th Regiment climbed a cliff to attack View post but a sentry shot the leaders; one of whom must have been carrying incendiary bombs as he burst into flames. By the light of this human torch the remaining would-be attackers were shot, and as a result the remaining Ottoman soldiers at the bottom of the cliff did not make another attack. Regardless, the attack by the Ottoman 163rd Regiment on Vaux post continued.

==== Reinforcements ====
When it was found that the Germans had advanced between the 2nd and 3rd Light Horse Regiments and reached the centre of the advanced Light Horse position, the reserve; the 1st Light Horse Regiment launched a counter-attack at 04:30. When the alarm had first been raised, the commander of the 1st Light Horse Brigade had sent forward one squadron of the reserve regiment; with four machine-guns to reinforce the 2nd Light Horse Regimental headquarters on Abu Tellul West and at 03:40 sent a second squadron forward which attacked Abu Tellul East.

At the foot of Abu Tellul an artillery officer found two officers and twelve men of the reserve regiment of the 1st Light Horse Brigade, who were on their way to counter-attack the Bluff and ordered the battery to fire in support of the assault. Their 13-pounder high explosive shells burst among the rocks of the German position causing forty Germans to quickly surrender. These prisoners were disarmed, and put in charge of two of the Australians, while the counter-attack; now reduced to seven Australians, moved forward again. Another group of Germans was discovered occupying the end part of Abu Tellul and again the battery opened fire, and after a few minutes, six officers and eighty men surrendered to seven light horsemen; the two groups of prisoners being quickly taken to the rear.

While the outer light horse posts had been surrounded, they had all held out, and turned their machine-guns on the attacking force and by this stage reinforcements of the 1st Light Horse Regiment and the Wellington Mounted Rifle Regiment, were pushing along both sides of the Abu Tellul Ridge, to quickly drive out the remainder of their opponents, and restored the position. The Germans were caught scattered and disorganised; the light horse posts had prevented them digging in and they were quickly swept from their position retreating back into the valley to the north where they were fired on from Mussallabeh posts.

The Germans still held their position at The Bluff as did the Australians and when, at 08:00, the 1st Light Horse Regiment retook the position just three men in The Bluff sangars out of twenty remained unwounded; while 100 Germans were captured. Meanwhile, the Ottoman 163rd Regiment's attack on Vaux post continued until they were strongly counter-attacked by the Wellington Mounted Rifle Regiment and driven back; the mounted riflemen capturing sixty-one prisoners.

=== Attack on the Wadi Mellaha ===
On the Wadi Mellaha the Ottomans shelled the 2nd Light Horse Brigade throughout the night; at dawn two German infantry companies from the 146th Regiment and two Ottoman battalions were seen at various points along the front digging trenches.

A troop from the 5th Light Horse Regiment from the 2nd Light Horse Brigade, twice left their lines with bombs, attacking a force many times their number. On the first occasion, a large group in front of Star Post near the centre of the line was reconnoitred by an officer and fourteen men. They got to within 20 yards (18 m) of a group of about 150 Germans position, who threatened to completely surround the small group; before being attacked by the light horsemen who captured fifteen prisoners. Two hours later at 08:00 the same officer went forward with twenty men to within bombing distance and charged throwing bombs and bayoneting many of the Ottomans. One officer and two light horsemen were slightly wounded, while they killed twenty-five, wounded thirty and captured thirty to forty-five, the remainder escaping to their rear position 1,000 yards (910 m) behind.

==== Results of the German and Ottoman infantry attacks ====
The German and Ottoman attacks on Abu Tellul and Mussallabeh, were successfully counter-attacked by the 1st Light Horse Brigade and the Wellington Mounted Rifle Regiment, while the remainder of the New Zealand Mounted Rifles Brigade cleared the country for 1,000 yards (910 m) in front of the original front line. After six-and-a-half hours of fierce hand-to-hand fighting at Mussallabeh, Abu Tellul and on the Wadi Mellaha, a total of 425–448 prisoners were captured, 358–377 of whom were German while the Light Horse suffered 108 casualties. Six machine-guns, forty-two automatic rifles, 185 rifles and a large quantity of ammunition were captured. In the rear of the attacking force the Ottoman 3rd Cavalry Division waited in vain for an opportunity to exploit any successes and link up with the attack on Abu Tellul.

=== Ottoman cavalry attack ===
Falls' Sketch Map 29 Abu Tellul cavalry operations at El Hinu Ford 14 July 1918

While the attacks on Mussallebeh and Abu Tellul on the western side of the Jordan River were in progress, an Ottoman cavalry force was seen massing for an attack on the east bank of the river. The cavalry were advancing towards El Hinu ford, between the Ghoraniyeh bridgehead and the Dead Sea. The Jodhpur and Mysore Lancers from the 15th (Imperial Service) Cavalry Brigade galloped out from the fords, while the Sherwood Rangers Yeomanry and the 34th Prince Albert Victor's Own Poona Horse, from the 14th Cavalry Brigade moved out from the Ghoraniyeh bridgehead to attack the Ottoman cavalry.

At 03:30 a squadron of the Jodhpore Lancers crossed the Jordan at the El Hinu ford and a squadron of the Mysore Lancers crossed at Makhadet Hijla to discover the Ottoman cavalry force on a 2-mile (3.2 km) long front with its right flank just north of the Wadi er Rame 1.5 miles (2.4 km) east of Makhadet Hijla. This force, made up of the Ottoman 9th and 11th Cavalry Regiments with one squadron of the 7th Cavalry Regiment, from the Caucasus Cavalry Brigade, was advancing towards the El Hinu ford; their squadrons forming a wide front while one squadron of the 7th Cavalry Regiment was in reserve in the rear. These squadrons attacked the outposts of the 15th (Imperial Service) Cavalry Brigade on the right of the Sherwood Rangers Yeomanry. Two armoured cars of No. 1 Australian Light Car Patrol supported the Imperial Service Cavalry Brigade in their successful counterattack.

At 10:30 two squadrons of the Jodhpore Lancers crossed the Jordan River at the El Hinu ford and moved 2.5 miles (4.0 km) east north-east to a ford over the Wadi er Rame, which flowed from the east at right angles into the Jordan River, at Ain el Garaba. Here they were to attack the Ottoman cavalry while the Mysore Lancers and Sherwood Rangers Yeomanry would be in support. When the two squadrons of Jodhpore Lancers were in position south of the Ottoman flank, they charged in extended order two horses' lengths apart. As they came under fire, they swung left-handed in column of troops and galloped due north with a machine-gun subsection covering this advance. The Jodhpore Lancers charge crashed into the Ottoman cavalry spearing a number with their lances before advancing to the ford, capturing fifty prisoners and a large number of horses. Here they came under heavy machine-gun fire from the right bank of the Wadi er Rame and suffered twenty-eight casualties out of the 125 men who were in the attack.

After seeing the advance of the Jodhpore Lancers, at 13:15 the Sherwood Rangers Yeomanry and Mysore Lancers advanced on the Ottoman cavalry; the Mysore Lancers attacking and spearing around thirty Ottoman soldiers before retiring from the open ground to the bank of the Wadi er Rame. At 14:30 the Poona Horse moved out of the Ghoraniyeh bridgehead and galloped through shellfire to get in touch with the Sherwood Rangers Yeomanry who were deployed in front of Ain el Garaba. Here their leading troop attacked straight towards the Ottoman trenches suffering six casualties and at 17:30 the Sherwood Rangers Yeomanry and Poona Horse attacked the same position, causing the Ottoman force to withdraw under cover of machine-gun fire.

The Jodhpore and Mysore Lancers and the Poona Horse commanded by Major General H.J.M. Macandrew took 100 prisoners, killing more than ninety Ottomans with the lance, but suffered the loss of eighty troopers. Nine men from the Alwar and Patiala Infantry defending the Ghoraniyeh bridgehead were wounded by artillery fire. The Ottoman prisoners included six officers, four squadron leaders and eighty-six other ranks.

=== Casualties ===
The total losses suffered by the German and Ottoman forces in the hills at Abu Tellul and Mussallabeh, at the Wadi Mellaha, and at the Wadi er Rame and Ain el Garaba defending the fords on the eastern bank of the Jordan, were 540 prisoners (377 German and 71 Ottoman) and up to 1,000 casualties while the British Empire forces suffered a total of 189 casualties. Between 14 and 15 July the 4th Light Horse Field Ambulance evacuated a total of 278 men; eighty-five of whom were wounded and forty-four sick Light Horsemen, twenty-four were wounded Lancers, 111 were wounded German prisoners and fourteen were wounded Ottoman prisoners.

Many casualties came in to the 4th Light Horse Field Ambulance soon after the long-range artillery shelling commenced; the numbers increasing when bombing and machine-gun attacks by the aircraft followed. Stretcher bearers collected the wounded from the front line and brought them to waiting ambulances which transported them back to the tent division of the field ambulance. At the tent division all wounded were attended, receiving emergency treatment from the medical officers and hospital staff before being loaded on the ambulances again by the stretcher bearers and evacuated by road to the casualty clearing stations in Jerusalem. Cars and extra men came from the 2nd Light Horse Field Ambulance to help the 4th Light Horse Field Ambulance as speedy evacuation was of major importance.

In the afternoon, German and Ottoman prisoners were brought in to the field ambulance, but they had to be separated to stop them fighting and abusing each other. The Germans blamed the Ottomans for letting them down and the Ottomans hated the Germans for their arrogance and envied their equipment. The Ottomans had practically no equipment, wore ragged clothes and had rags round their feet instead of boots while the German soldiers were in good uniforms and boots and the equipment in their haversacks included a supply of quinine, for prophylactic use against malaria, as well as water bottles.

== Aftermath ==
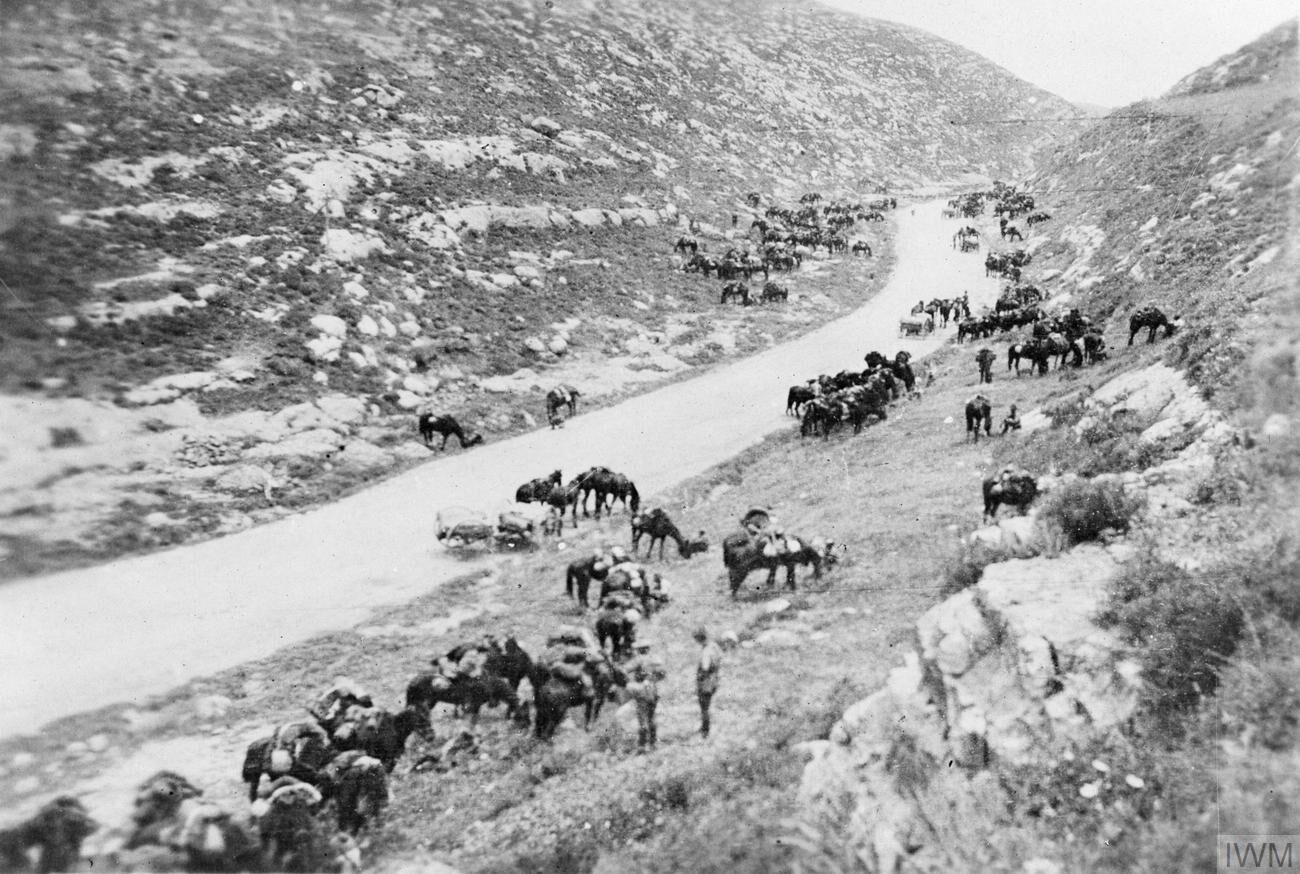
The 1st Light Horse Brigade resting on the road between Jerusalem and Latron after fighting at Abu Tellul on 14–16 July

While the Egyptian Expeditionary Force had successfully demonstrated its attacking abilities at Gaza, Beersheba, Jaffa and Jerusalem, this victory by the Desert Mounted Corps' Australian Light Horse, British Yeomanry, Indian Lancers and New Zealand Mounted Rifles' brigades demonstrated their strength in defence in the face of determined German and Ottoman attacks. This had been the only occasion during the Sinai and Palestine campaign when German infantry attacked as storm-troopers and Chauvel commented on their crushing defeat, that it might improve the image of Australian troopers "in the minds of their detractors, who are many."

The defeat was a severe blow to German prestige. German prisoners captured at Abu Tellul claimed they had been betrayed by their Ottoman allies who should have more strongly supported their flanks. Von Sanders, their commander in chief, knew that these same regiments had fought well, just a few months before, during the two Transjordan attacks in March and April. He later wrote that "Nothing had occurred to show me so clearly the decline in the fighting capacity of the Turkish troops as the events of the 14th July." (Note: Written in hindsight and probably after the defeat at Megiddo, von Sanders ignores the difficulties of the terrain the Ottoman infantry were faced with in making their attacks on the flanks, the all-round nature of the light horse defences, the strength of those positions and the determination of the defenders.)

An Ottoman artillery attack began at 01:00 on Tuesday 16 July and the 1st Light Horse Brigade, still in position on Abu Tellul and Mussallabeh, was heavily shelled. Over 1,500 shells were fired at their positions, causing heavy casualties, especially among the horses, who were not well protected against shell fire or bomb attacks. The accuracy of the Ottoman artillery was enhanced by spotter planes and accurate distance observation posts. In the afternoon when the 3rd Light Horse Brigade moved to relieve the 1st Light Horse Brigade; their advance guard was so heavily shelled that the main body of brigade did not take over until after dark. During the day gas drills were carried out and funk holes dug. Just two months later on 19 September, the Battle of Megiddo, which finished the war in this theatre, began.
