= XX Corps (United Kingdom) =

British army unit in First World War

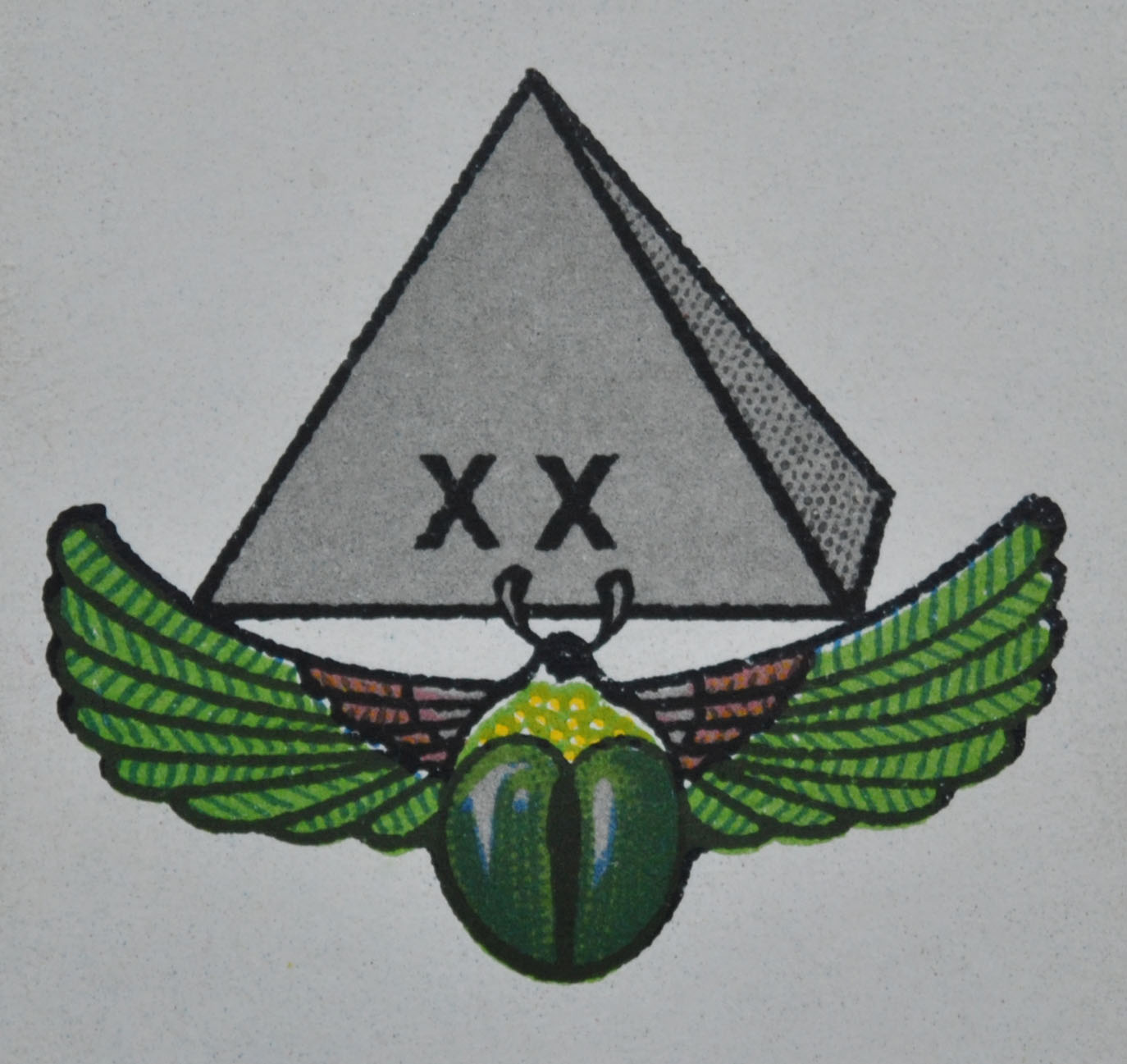
- XX Corps formation badge.
- Active: World War I
- Country: United Kingdom
- Branch: British Army
- Type: Field corps
- Part of: Egyptian Expeditionary Force
- Engagements: World War I: Sinai and Palestine Campaign; Beersheba; Battle of Megiddo

The XX Corps was an army corps of the British Army during World War I.

== First World War ==
The Corps was formed in Palestine in June 1917 under Lieutenant General Philip Chetwode. Following the British failure in the Second Battle of Gaza, the Egyptian Expeditionary Force underwent a major rearrangement with the appointment of General Edmund Allenby as the new Commander-in-Chief. The infantry component of the force was divided into two corps; XX Corps and XXI Corps.

The corps initially comprised four infantry divisions:

- 10th (Irish) Division
- 53rd (Welsh) Division
- 60th (2/2nd London) Division
- 74th (Yeomanry) Division

The XX Corps first saw action in the Beersheba phase of the Third Battle of Gaza on 31 October 1917. The 60th and 74th Divisions captured Turkish outposts west of the town but were not involved in the final assault. Following Beersheba on 6 November, the corps made a frontal assault against the Turkish fortifications in the vicinity of Sheria where the 10th, 60th and 74th Divisions succeeded in breaking through. The 10th Division captured the Hareira Redoubt on 7 November and the 60th Division advanced on Huj in support of the Australian Mounted Division's effort to cut off the retreating Turkish army.

During the Battle of Megiddo the formation was:

- Corps Troops
- 10th (Irish) Division
- 53rd (Welsh) Division

== General officers commanding ==
Commanders included:

- 2 August – 20 August 1917 Lieutenant-General Sir Philip Chetwode
- 20 August – 31 August 1917 Major-General John Shea (acting)
- 31 August 1917 – November 1918 Lieutenant-General Sir Philip Chetwode

== See also ==
- British military history

== Bibliography ==
- Doughty, Robert A. (2005). Pyrrhic Victory: French Strategy and Operation in the Great War. Cambridge, MA=London: Belknap Press.
- Grainger, John D (2006). The Battle for Palestine, 1917. Woodbridge: Boydell Press.
