= Martin Farndale =

British Army general (1929–2000)

General Sir Martin Farndale KCB
- Born: 6 January 1929
- Died: 10 May 2000 (aged 71)
- Military career
- Allegiance: United Kingdom
- Branch: British Army
- Service years: 1948–1987
- Rank: General
- Service number: 397237
- Commands: British Army of the Rhine; 1st British Corps; 2nd Armoured Division; 7th Armoured Brigade; 1st Regiment Royal Horse Artillery
- Conflicts: The Troubles
- Awards: Knight Commander of the Order of the Bath

General Sir Martin Baker Farndale, KCB (6 January 1929 – 10 May 2000) was a British Army officer who reached high office in the 1980s.

== Military career ==
Educated at Yorebridge Grammar School, Askrigg, and the Royal Military Academy Sandhurst, Farndale was commissioned into the Royal Artillery in November 1948. He went to the Staff College, Camberley in 1959.

In 1969 Farndale was appointed commanding officer of 1st Regiment Royal Horse Artillery, which was deployed to Northern Ireland at the early stages of The Troubles. In 1973 he was appointed commander of the 7th Armoured Brigade in Germany before, in 1978, he returned to the UK to become director of operations at the Ministry of Defence in which role he had to organise the disarming of guerillas in order to facilitate the creation of the future nation of Zimbabwe. He was appointed general officer commanding (GOC) 2nd Armoured Division in Germany in 1980.

In 1983, Farndale became GOC of 1st British Corps. In 1985, he was made GOC of British Army of the Rhine and Northern Army Group. He was also colonel commandant of the Army Air Corps from 1980 to 1987.

Following his retirement at the end of December 1987, Farndale was a defence adviser to Short Brothers plc and to Deloitte Touche and wrote four volumes of the History of the Royal Artillery.

== Honours ==
Farndale was appointed a Companion of the Order of the Bath (CB) in the 1980 Birthday Honours, and promoted to Knight Commander of the Order (KCB) in the 1983 Birthday Honours.

== Family ==
In 1955 Farndale married Margaret Anne Buckingham. They had one son.

Military offices
Preceded by Alexander Boswell	General Officer Commanding the 2nd Armoured Division; 1980–1983	Succeeded by Patrick Palmer (as GOC 2nd Infantry Division)
Preceded by Sir Nigel Bagnall	GOC 1st (British) Corps; 1983–1985	Succeeded by Sir Brian Kenny
Preceded by Sir Nigel Bagnall	Commander-in-Chief of the British Army of the Rhine; 1985–1987	Succeeded by Sir Brian Kenny
Honorary titles
Preceded by Sir Thomas Morony	Master Gunner, St. James's Park; 1988–1996	Succeeded by Lord Vincent
