= 12th Cavalry Brigade (British Indian Army) =

North Midland Mounted Brigade 22nd Mounted Brigade 12th Cavalry Brigade
- Active: 1908 – 1921
- Country: United Kingdom
- Allegiance: British Crown
- Branch: British Army; British Indian Army
- Type: Yeomanry, Cavalry
- Size: Brigade
- Part of: 1st Mounted Division; ANZAC Mounted Division; Yeomanry Mounted Division; 4th Cavalry Division
- HQ (peacetime): Leicester
- Engagements: First World War: Egypt and Palestine 1916–18

The North Midland Mounted Brigade (later numbered as the 22nd Mounted Brigade) was a yeomanry brigade of the British Army, formed as part of the Territorial Force in 1908.

It served in the Sinai and Palestine Campaign in the First World War.

In April 1918, it was merged with elements of the 2nd (Sialkot) Cavalry Brigade to form 12th Cavalry Brigade. It remained in Palestine after the end of the war on occupation duties.

== Formation ==
Under the terms of the Territorial and Reserve Forces Act 1907 (7 Edw.7, c.9), the brigade was formed in 1908 as part of the Territorial Force. It consisted of three yeomanry regiments, a horse artillery battery and ammunition column, a transport and supply column and a field ambulance.

As the name suggests, the units were drawn from the northern part of the English Midlands, predominantly Leicestershire, Lincolnshire and Staffordshire.

== First World War ==
=== North Midland Mounted Brigade ===
The brigade was embodied on 4 August 1914, and assigned to Third Army of the Central Force. It moved to Norfolk and joined 1st Mounted Division in September 1914, replacing the Nottinghamshire and Derbyshire Mounted Brigade. It remained with 1st Mounted Division until October 1915, when it departed (as a mounted formation) for the Mediterranean.

The 1/1st Leicestershire Yeomanry left the brigade in late October 1914 and was posted to the British Expeditionary Force (BEF), joining the 7th Cavalry Brigade. It was initially replaced by the 1/1st Welsh Horse Yeomanry before it transferred to the Eastern Mounted Brigade in February 1915. In May 1915, the 1/1st East Riding Yeimanry joined to bring the brigade back up to a three regiment strength.

The brigade was replaced in 1st Mounted Division by its 2nd Line. On 27 October 1915, the brigade departed Southampton on RMS Victorian, Mercian and Nessian for Salonika. The destination was changed at sea, and the brigade disembarked at Alexandria between 10 and 20 November 1915, then moved to Cairo. On arrival in Egypt, the North Midland Mounted Brigade was assigned to the Western Frontier Force.

=== 22nd Mounted Brigade ===
22nd Mounted Brigade
Organisation, July 1917

- 1/1st Staffordshire Yeomanry
- 1/1st Lincolnshire Yeomanry
- 1/1st East Riding of Yorkshire Yeomanry
- 18th Machine Gun Squadron
- 22nd Mounted Brigade Signal Troop, RE
- 1/North Midland Cavalry Field Ambulance, RAMC
- 3/1st North Midland Mobile Veterinary Section

On 31 March 1916, the remaining Mounted Brigades were numbered in a single sequence. As a consequence, the North Midland Mounted Brigade was redesignated as 22nd Mounted Brigade. The 18th Machine Gun Squadron was formed on 8 January 1917.

The brigade joined the ANZAC Mounted Division in February 1917 and took part in the First and Second Battles of Gaza.

The complete brigade was transferred to the newly formed Yeomanry Mounted Division on 6 July 1917, joining it at el Fuqari. From 31 October it took part in the Third Battle of Gaza, including the Battle of Beersheba and the Capture of the Sheria Position. It took part in the Battle of Mughar Ridge on 13 and 14 November and the Battle of Nebi Samwil from 17 to 24 November. From 27 to 29 November, it withstood the Turkish counter-attacks during the Capture of Jerusalem.

=== 12th Cavalry Brigade ===
12th Cavalry Brigade
Organisation, September 1918

- 1/1st Staffordshire Yeomanry
- 6th King Edward's Own Cavalry
- 19th Lancers (Fane's Horse)
- 18th Machine Gun Squadron
- 12th Cavalry Brigade Signal Troop
- 12th Combined Cavalry Field Ambulance, RAMC
- 12th Mobile Veterinary Section

In March 1918, the 1st Indian Cavalry Division was broken up in France. The British units (notably 6th (Inniskilling) Dragoons, 17th Lancers, 1/1st Queen's Own Yorkshire Dragoons and A, Q and U Batteries RHA) remained in France and the Indian elements were sent to Egypt.

By an Egyptian Expeditionary Force GHQ Order of 12 April 1918, the mounted troops of the EEF were reorganised when the Indian Army units arrived in theatre. On 24 April 1918, the Yeomanry Mounted Division was indianized (Note: British divisions were converted to the British Indian Army standard whereby brigades only retained one British regiment or battalion and most support units were Indian (artillery excepted).) and its title was changed to 1st Mounted Division, the third distinct division to bear this title. (Note: See 1st Mounted Division and 3rd Mounted Division.)

On 24 April 1918, the 22nd Mounted Brigade was merged with elements of the 2nd (Sialkot) Cavalry Brigade:

- the 1/1st Staffordshire Yeomanry remained with the brigade
- the 1/1st Lincolnshire Yeomanry and the 1/1st East Riding Yeomanry left the brigade on 7 April and were merged to form D Battalion, Machine Gun Corps. It was posted to France, arriving on 1 June
- 6th King Edward's Own Cavalry joined from 2nd (Sialkot) Cavalry Brigade
- 19th Lancers (Fane's Horse) joined from 2nd (Sialkot) Cavalry Brigade
- 18th Machine Gun Squadron remained with the brigade
- 22nd Mounted Brigade Signal Troop remained with the brigade
- on 24 April, 1/North Midland Cavalry Field Ambulance merged with Sialkot Cavalry Field Ambulance to form 22nd Combined Cavalry Field Ambulance
- on 26 and 27 April, 3/1st North Midland Mobile Veterinary Section merged with Sialkot Mobile Veterinary Section to form 22nd Mobile Veterinary Section

On 22 July 1918, the 1st Mounted Division was renumbered as the 4th Cavalry Division and the brigade as 12th Cavalry Brigade. The sub units (Signal Troop, Combined Cavalry Field Ambulance and Mobile Veterinary Section) were renumbered on the same date.

The brigade remained with 4th Cavalry Division for the rest of the war, taking part in the Battle of Megiddo and the Capture of Damascus.

After the Armistice of Mudros, the brigade remained with 4th Cavalry Division in Palestine as part of the occupation forces. However, demobilization began immediately and by May 1919 most of the British units had been repatriated. The division was finally broken up in 1921.

== Commanders ==
The North Midland Mounted Brigade / 22nd Mounted Brigade / 12th Cavalry Brigade had the following commanders:

From	Rank	Name
1 September 1911	Colonel	Coventry Williams
5 August 1914	Brigadier-General	Coventry Williams
12 March 1916	Brigadier-General	W. Bromley-Davenport
29 November 1916	Brigadier-General	F. A. B. Fryer
29 November 1916	Brigadier-General	P. D. FitzGerald, DSO, psc
7 April 1918	Brigadier-General	J. T. Wigan, CMG, DSO

== See also ==
- 12th Indian Cavalry Brigade existed at the same time but was unrelated other than having the same number
- 2/1st North Midland Mounted Brigade for the 2nd Line formation
- British yeomanry during the First World War

== Bibliography ==
- Becke, Archibald F. (1936). Order of Battle of Divisions Part 2A. The Territorial Force Mounted Divisions and the 1st-Line Territorial Force Divisions (42–56). London: HMSO. OCLC 4405016.
- James, Brigadier E.A. (1978). British Regiments 1914–18. London: Samson Books Limited. ISBN 0-906304-03-2.
- Perry, F.W. (1992). Order of Battle of Divisions Part 5A. The Divisions of Australia, Canada and New Zealand and those in East Africa. Newport: Ray Westlake Military Books. ISBN 1-871167-25-6.
- Perry, F.W. (1993). Order of Battle of Divisions Part 5B. Indian Army Divisions. Newport: Ray Westlake Military Books. ISBN 1-871167-23-X.
- Rinaldi, Richard A (2008). Order of Battle of the British Army 1914. Ravi Rikhye. ISBN 978-0-97760728-0.
- Westlake, Ray (1992). British Territorial Units 1914-18. Osprey Publishing. ISBN 978-1-85532-168-7.
