= General Pike =

General Pike may refer to:

- Albert Pike (1809–1891), Confederate States Army brigadier general
- Hew Pike (born 1943), British Army lieutenant general
- William Pike (British Army officer) (1905–1993), British Army lieutenant general
- Zebulon Pike (1779–1813), U.S. Army brigadier general
