= 232nd Brigade =

232nd Brigade may refer to:

- 232nd Brigade, Royal Field Artillery, United Kingdom
- 232nd Infantry Brigade, United Kingdom

== See also ==
- 232nd Regiment (disambiguation)
