= 1st Staffordshire Artillery Volunteers =

1st Staffordshire Artillery Volunteers 2nd North Midland Brigade, RFA 61st (North Midland) Field Rgt, RA 61st (North Midland) Super Heavy Rgt, RA 261 (North Midland) Locating Rgt, RA
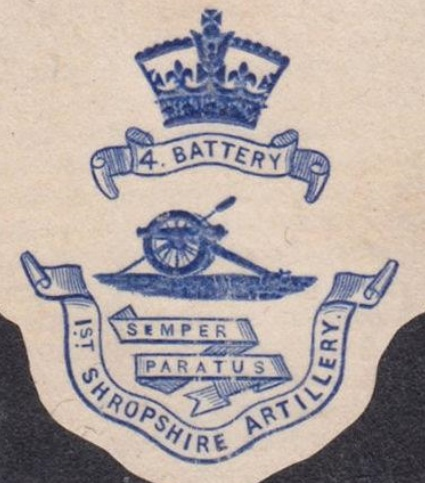
- Letterhead of the 4th Battery, Shropshire and Staffordshire Artillery Volunteers, c1900
- Active: 1860–1969
- Country: United Kingdom
- Branch: Volunteer Force/Territorial Army
- Role: Garrison artillery Field artillery Super-heavy artillery Locating unit
- Garrison/HQ: Shelton, Staffordshire
- Engagements: First World War: Battle of the Hohenzollern Redoubt; Battle of Gommecourt; Battle of the Menin Road Ridge; Battle of Polygon Wood; Battle of Cambrai; Battle of St Quentin; Battle of the St Quentin Canal; Second World War: Battle of Falaise; Operation Guildford

Commanders
- Notable commanders: Sir Smith Hill Child, 2nd Baronet

The 1st Staffordshire Artillery Volunteers, later 2nd North Midland Brigade, was a Volunteer unit of the Royal Artillery of the British Army recruiting primarily from Staffordshire. It fought on the Western Front during World War I and in the Normandy Campaign and Belgium, Holland, and Germany during World War II. Postwar, it was reformed as a specialist locating unit.

== Volunteer Force ==
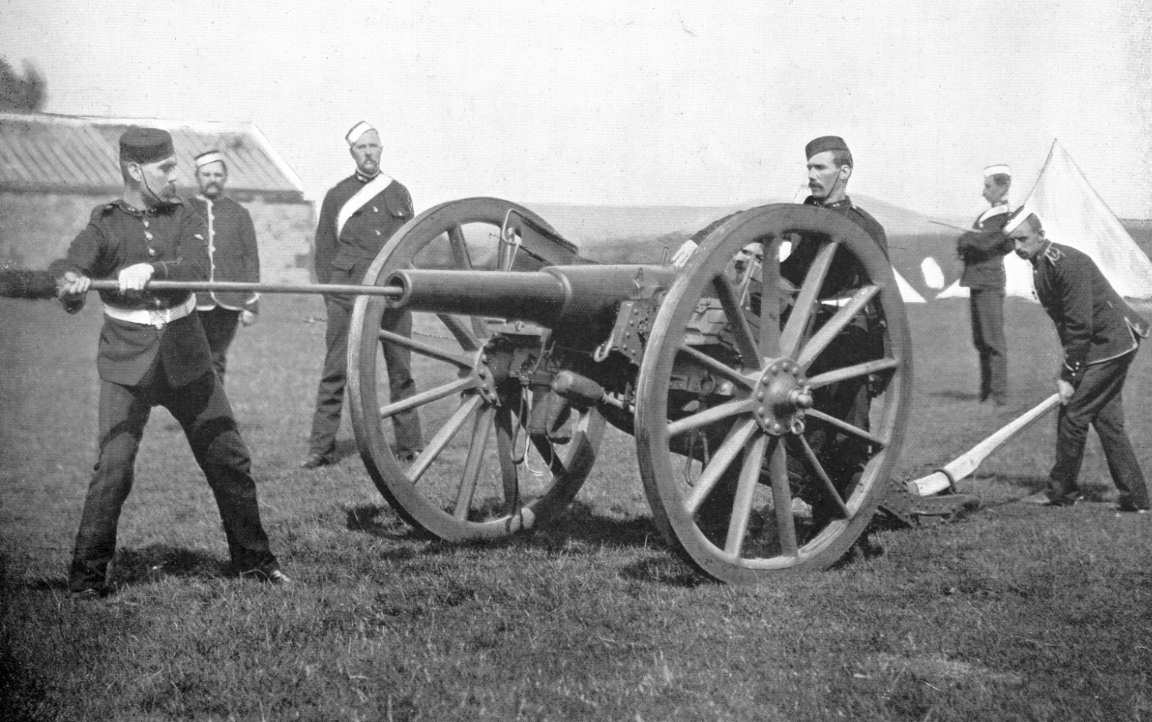
16 pdr RML Shropshire & Staffordshire Volunteer Artillery, 1897

The enthusiasm for the Volunteer movement following an invasion scare in 1859 saw the creation of many units composed of part-time soldiers eager to supplement the Regular British Army in time of need. The 1st Staffordshire Artillery Volunteer Corps (AVC) was one such unit, formed at Etruria, Staffordshire, with the first officers' commissions being issued on 18 December 1860. A second battery was formed by October 1863, a third on 16 October 1866 and a fourth on 10 May 1879. Initially, the 1st Staffordshire (along with the 1st Shropshire and 1st Worcestershire AVCs; there were no 2nd AVCs in any of these counties) formed part of the 1st Cheshire Administrative Brigade. In 1869, it became part of a new 1st Shropshire Administrative Brigade (again with the 1st Shropshire and 1st Worcestershire), with William Field of the 1st Shropshire as lieutenant-colonel in command.

Later, the Worcester Volunteers left to join with the Warwickshires and, in 1880, the 1st Shropshire and Staffordshire Volunteer Artillery were consolidated into a single unit, with the Staffords providing Nos 5 to 8 Batteries. It was organised as a brigade of 'position artillery', equipped with 16 Pounder Rifled Muzzle Loading field guns. In 1882, all the artillery volunteers were attached to one of the territorial garrison divisions of the Royal Artillery, with the Shropshire and Staffordshire unit attached to the Lancashire Division. When the Lancashire Division was abolished in 1889, the unit transferred to the Southern Division. In 1899, all the artillery volunteers became part of the Royal Garrison Artillery (RGA) and in 1902 the unit was renamed the 1st Shropshire and Staffordshire RGA (Volunteers) with two companies. As late as 1906, they were still using the 16 Pounders in their annual camp at Bare, Morecambe. The brigade's headquarters was at Etruria, later moving to Shelton, Staffordshire.

== Territorial Force ==
When the RGA (V) were incorporated into the Territorial Force in 1908 under the Haldane Reforms, the Shropshire Battery was separated once more to become the Shropshire Royal Horse Artillery. The Staffordshire Battery expanded to form two and these were joined by a third battery formed from J Company of the 1st Volunteer Battalion, North Staffordshire Regiment at Leek. This company had originally been raised as the 28th Staffordshire Rifle Volunteer Corps on 28 April 1860 (the rest of the 1st VB became 5th Battalion North Staffordshires). Together, the RGA at Shelton and the infantry at Leek were formed into a brigade of the Royal Field Artillery (RFA) with the following organisation:

II North Midland Brigade, RFA

- HQ at Victoria Square, Shelton
- 1st Staffordshire Battery, Shelton
- 2nd Staffordshire Battery, Shelton
- 3rd Staffordshire Battery, Alma Street, Belle Vue, Leek
- II North Midland Brigade Ammunition Column, Shelton

The brigade was assigned to the North Midland Division of the TF. Sir Smith Hill Child, 2nd Baronet, a local Staffordshire landowner and former officer in the Irish Guards, was appointed commanding officer in 1910.

== World War I ==
=== Mobilisation ===
The order to mobilise was received on 4 August 1914. Shortly afterwards, the men were invited to volunteer for overseas service, and the majority having accepted this liability, the North Midland Division concentrated at Luton. In November, it moved to the area round Bishop's Stortford where it completed its war training. At the time of mobilisation, the three batteries of II North Midland Brigade were each equipped with four 15-pounder field guns.

Meanwhile, the men who had not volunteered for foreign service, together with the recruits who were coming forward, remained at Stoke-on-Trent to form a 2nd Line unit designated the 2/II North Midland Brigade, after which the parent unit became the 1/II Brigade.

=== 1/II North Midland Brigade ===
The North Midland Division began embarking for France on 25 February 1915 and, by 8 March, had completed its concentration at Ploegsteert in Belgium – the first complete TF division to deploy to the Western Front. It was numbered the 46th (North Midland) Division shortly afterwards. Over the following months, the artillery supported the division's infantry in routine trench warfare, particularly when 139th (Nottinghamshire and Derbyshire) Brigade was caught in the German flamethrower attack at Hooge in the Ypres Salient on 30–31 July 1915.

==== Hohenzollern Redoubt ====
The 46th Division's first offensive operation was the Battle of the Hohenzollern Redoubt. This was an attempt to restart the failed Battle of Loos, and the division was moved down from Ypres on 1 October for the purpose. The Germans recaptured the Hohenzollern trench system on 3 October, and the new attack was aimed at this point. The artillery bombardment (by the field guns of 46th and 28th Divisions, backed by heavy batteries) began at 12.00 on 13 October and the infantry went in at 14.00 behind a gas cloud. The attack was a disaster; most of the leading waves being cut down by machine gun and shell fire from German positions that had not been suppressed by the bombardment.

On 23 December, the 46th (NM) Division was ordered to embark for Egypt. It entrained for Marseille, and some of the infantry had actually reached Egypt before the order was rescinded on 21 January 1916. The artillery returned from Marseille and the whole division reassembled on the Western Front near Amiens by 14 February.

46th Divisional Artillery rearmed with 18-pounder guns in November 1915. In April and May 1916, the BEF's artillery was reorganised: II North Midland Brigade became CCXXXI Bde RFA (231 Brigade), its batteries were lettered A–C, and a new D Battery was formed. D Battery was almost immediately exchanged for D (Howitzer) Battery from CCXXXIII Brigade (formerly A Battery of CLIV (Empire) Brigade, a unit from Croydon attached to the New Army 36th (Ulster) Division) equipped with 4 x 4.5-inch howitzers. Lastly, the Brigade Ammunition Columns were absorbed into the Divisional Ammunition Column.

==== Gommecourt ====
On 1 May 1916, the division was ordered into the line facing Gommecourt in preparation for the forthcoming Somme Offensive. Over the first 10 days of the month, the divisional artillery took over the existing battery positions along this front and began digging additional ones. The sector was a quiet one, but on the night of 15/16 May there was a sudden German bombardment of the division's positions, apparently set off by the Germans detecting a wiring party of the adjacent 56t (1st London) Division working in No-Man's Land. CCXXXI's batteries returned the fire from their position behind Foncquevillers, and the exchange went on for about 50 minutes.

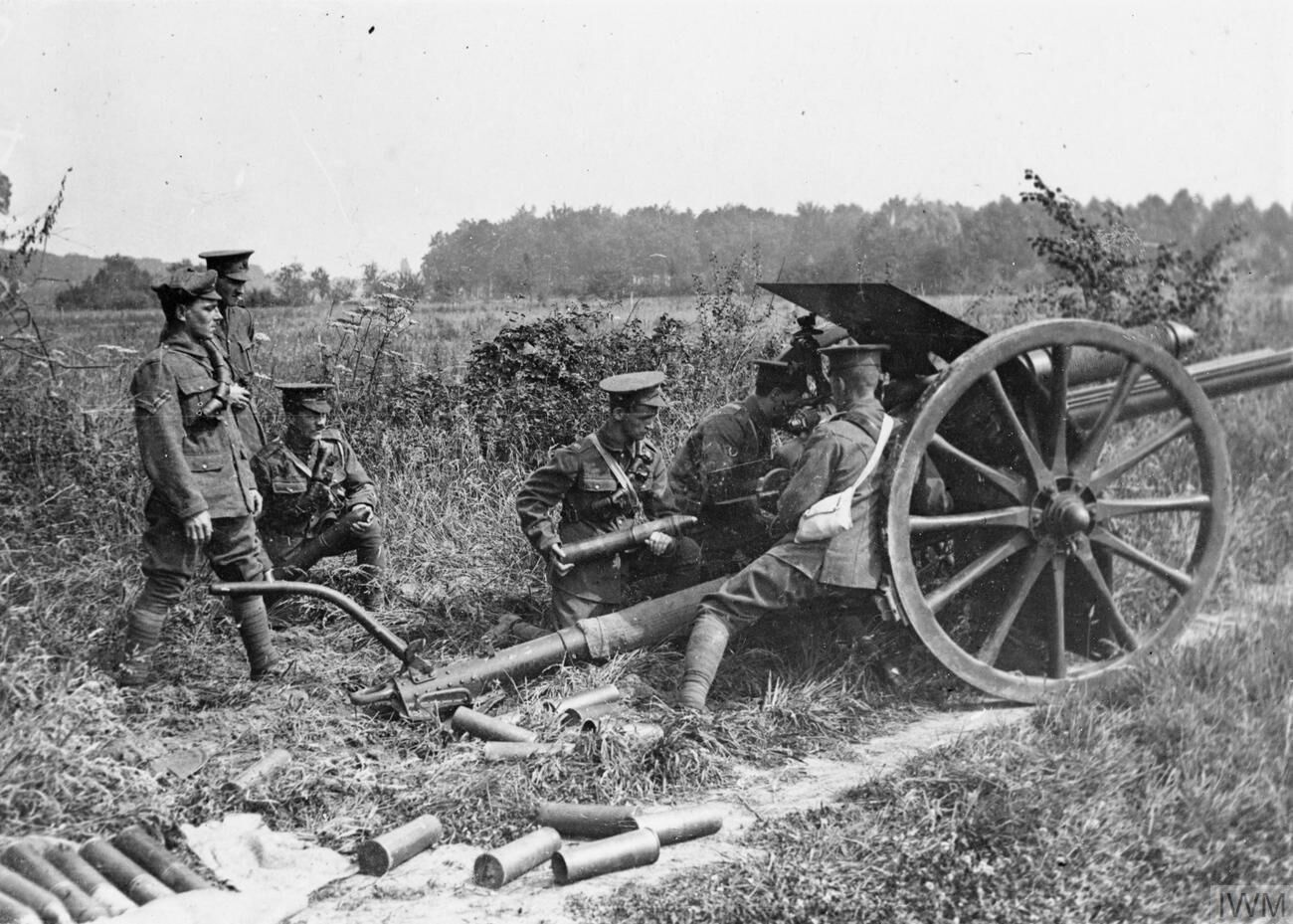
18-pounder in action on the Somme

Preparations were under way for the 46th and 56th Divisions' assault on Gommecourt on 1 July as a diversion from the main attack further south. While the heavy guns were moved up and dug in, CCXXXI's 18-pounders were used on 22 May to bombard a suspected German machine gun position. On 18 June, the divisional artillery was allocated its tasks for wire-cutting and registration of targets ahead of the attack: CCXXXI and CCXXXII Brigades formed the Left group, under the command of Lieutenant Colonel Hill Child of CCXXXI. This group supported the attack of 139 Brigade, which was made by two battalions (1/5th and 1/7th (Robin Hoods) Sherwood Foresters) over a frontage of 520 yards into an area of dead ground in front of Gommecourt Wood where the German wire entanglements could not be seen by artillery observers.

Although CCXXXI Brigade thought that its wirecutting was successful, the results of this bombardment were patchy. The Germans reported that in this area their 'front trenches were levelled and the wire shot away' but their casualties had been few because of their deep dugouts, and when the attack went in on 1 July their men emerged to receive the attack with heavy machine-gun and rifle fire. During the attack, the 18-pounders fired a covering barrage, which was lifted onto each enemy trench line in turn, but the infantry were unable to keep up with these lifts: artillery observation during the attack was difficult due to the smokescreen and confusion. 139 Brigade broke into the first German trench and some parties reached the second, but overall the attack was a bloody failure, as was the whole Gommecourt action. Attempts to reinforce 139 Brigade during the afternoon broke down and the Germans retook the positions lost.

Although the 46th Division remained in the line in front of Gommecourt until March 1917 (apart from a month's rest in November), it did not attack again. On 28 August 1916, the brigade's former D Battery returned, and was broken up to bring B and C Batteries up to six guns each. Similarly, A Battery received a section from CCXXXII Brigade's D Battery. On 2 January 1917, C (H)/CCXXXII (former 512 (H) Battery) was broken up and a section joined D (H)/CCXXXI to bring it up to six 4.5-inch howitzers. For the remainder of the war, the brigade had the following organisation:

- A/CCXXXI (1st Stafford Battery + half former D/CCXXXII) 6 x 18-pdrs
- B/CCXXXI (2nd Stafford Battery + half former D Battery) 6 x 18-pdrs
- C/CCXXXI (3rd Stafford Battery + half former D Battery) 6 x 18-pdrs
- D (H)/CCXXXI (Empire Battery + half 512 Battery) 6 x 4.5-inch howitzers

==== Bucquoy ====
At the beginning of March 1917, patrols found that the Germans were beginning to retreat from the Gommecourt defences. The division followed up slowly and cautiously, but on the night of 14 March an attack on Bucquoy Graben (trench) by 137th (Staffordshire) Brigade led to heavy casualties. The rushed attack had been ordered by V Corps headquarters despite the protests of the divisional commander, and there was not time for the artillery adequately to cut the enemy wire. The attack went in behind an artillery barrage moving at 100 yards in four minutes but although 'the assault was gallantly pressed' (Official History) it was a complete failure. The Germans eventually retreated as far as their new Hindenburg Line defences well beyond the Somme battlefields, but 46th Division was withdrawn from the pursuit on 17 March.

==== Lens ====
After rest and training, the 46th Division returned to the line in the coal-mining sector around Lens in April. In May and June, the division carried out small-scale operations against Hill 65. 46th Division was now ordered to capture Lens itself, beginning on 28 June. Another divisional attack on 1 July aimed at capturing more houses and trenches. 137 Brigade attacked 'Aconite' trench behind a creeping barrage beginning at 02.47. By 07.00, the two right companies held Aconite, but the two left companies were held up in severe house-to-house fighting. A second push at 08.00 cleared the cellars round the church and caused heavy casualties to the defenders. But, in the afternoon, a German counter-attacks drove the battalion back to its start line. , After Lens, the division was withdrawn into reserve, and did not engage in major operations again during 1917. On 13 March 1918 the brigadier-general, Royal Artillery, (BGRA) of 46th Division was wounded, and Hill Child took over in an acting capacity. On 22 March, Hill Child was confirmed as BGRA, a position he held until the end of the war.

==== St Quentin Canal ====
The 46th Division had been very unlucky during the war, the infantry in particular taking appalling casualties at the Hohenzollern Redoubt and Gommecourt, but it gained revenge at the Battle of the St Quentin Canal on 29 September 1918 when it performed one of the great feats of the First World War by crossing the canal and breaking open the Hindenburg Line. Careful artillery preparation and support was an integral part of this success. Hill Child had nine brigades of field artillery under his command, including CCXXXI Brigade, and several brigades of corps heavy artillery were also firing on the division's front. The bombardment began on the night of 26/27 September with harassing fire and gas shells, followed with intense bombardment with high explosive shells until the morning of the assault. Every field gun was used in carefully timed barrages: 'creeping barrages' (including smoke shells) ahead of the attacking troops, with pauses at the end of each phase, including a 'standing barrage' of three hours to allow mopping-up of the first objectives to be carried out, and the second wave of troops to pass through and renew the attack behind the creeping barrage. The first of these creeping barrages actually progressed at twice the normal pace while the infantry rushed downhill to seize the canal crossings; it was described in the Official History as 'one of the finest ever seen'.

The attack was a brilliant success, and by the afternoon the field artillery batteries were crossing the canal by the bridges that had been captured or thrown across, and were coming into action on the far side. Over succeeding weeks, the division took part in a succession of successive follow-up attacks: Battle of the Beaurevoir Line, Battle of Cambrai (1918), Battle of the Selle and Battle of the Sambre (1918). On 8 November 1918, in its last operation of the war, 46th Division pushed forward 138 Brigade to seize the Avesnes road, aided by concentrations of fire from CCXXXI Brigade on the main points of resistance.

CCXXXI Brigade was placed in suspended animation in 1919.

=== 2/II North Midland Bde ===
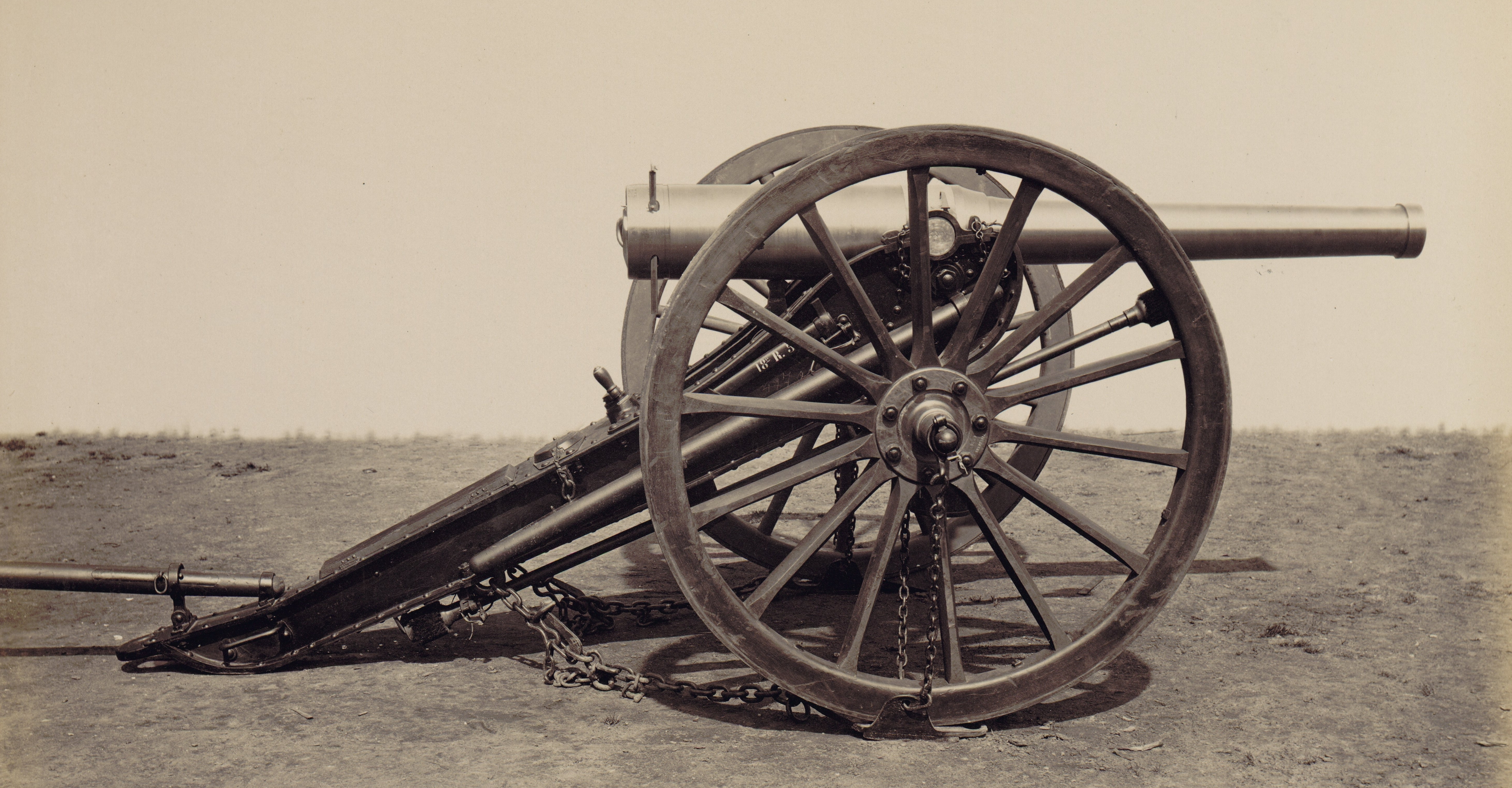
French De Bange 90 mm gun, issued to 2nd Line RFA units.

Meanwhile, the men who had not volunteered for foreign service, together with the recruits who were coming forward, remained to form the 2/I North Midland Brigade, RFA, in the 2nd North Midland Division (59th (2nd North Midland) Division from August 1915), which concentrated round Luton in January 1915. At first, the 2nd Line recruits had to parade in civilian clothes and train with 'Quaker' guns – logs of wood mounted on cart wheels – but these shortages were slowly made up. Uniforms arrived in November 1914, but it was not until March 1915 that a few 90 mm French guns arrived for training. The division took over the requisitioned transport and second-hand horse harness when 46th Division was re-equipped and left for France. The divisional artillery were joined at Luton by the 1st Line 4th Home Counties (Howitzer) Brigade, RFA, and Wessex Heavy Bty, RGA, which were fully equipped and could lend guns for training. Later, the 59th Divisional Artillery took over some 15-pounders (without sights) from a TF division that was proceeding to India. In July, the division moved out of overcrowded Luton, the artillery moving to Hemel Hempstead, where they spent the winter of 1915–16. In early 1916 the batteries were finally brought up to establishment in horses, and 18-pounders replaced the 15-pounders.

After the Easter Rising in April, the division was sent to Ireland. Once the trouble in Dublin had been suppressed, the troops moved out to The Curragh to continue training.

In April 1916, the batteries were designated A, B and C, and later the brigade was numbered CCXCVI (296). At the end of May, 2/1st Essex Royal Horse Artillery joined the brigade as D Battery, but was exchanged in July for B (Howitzer) Battery of CCXCVIII (2/IV North Midland) Brigade. This battery, originally designated 2/2nd Derbyshire Howitzer Battery, was equipped with 4.5-inch howitzers and became D (H) Battery.

In January 1917, the 59th Division was relieved in Ireland and returned to the United Kingdom, concentrating at the Fovant training area on the edge of Salisbury Plain preparatory to embarking for France. Before departure, the artillery underwent a further reorganisation, with A, B and C Batteries of CCXCVI each receiving a section from A, B and C Batteries of CCXCVII (formerly 2/III North Midland) Brigade, bringing them up to a strength of six guns each. In France, D (H) Battery was similarly made up with a section from C (H)/CCXCVIII (formerly 3 (H)/LIX in 11th (Northern) Division). The final organisation of the brigade was therefore as follows:

- A/CCXCVI (2/1st Stafford Bty + half former 2/4th Stafford Battery) 6 x 18-pdrs
- B/CCXCVI (2/2nd Stafford Bty + half former 2/5th Stafford Battery) 6 x 18-pdrs
- C/CCXCVI (2/3rd Stafford Bty + half former 2/6th Stafford Battery) 6 x 18-pdrs
- D (H)/CCXCVI (2/2nd Derbyshire (H) Battery + half former 3 (H)/LIX) 6 x 4.5-inch howitzers

59th Division began crossing to France on 17 February 1917 and completed its concentration around Mericourt by 3 March.

==== 3rd Ypres ====
The 59th Division took part in following the German Army's retreat to the Hindenburg Line in March and April, but it was not until September that it was engaged in its first full-scale action, the phase of the 3rd Ypres Offensive known as the Battle of the Menin Road Ridge. This was a carefully prepared assault with massive artillery preparation, and most of the objectives were taken easily. The next phase, the Battle of Polygon Wood (26 September), was equally successful, with 176th Brigade advancing steadily behind its barrage onto the final objectives.

==== Bourlon Wood ====
59th Division was next moved south to join in the Battle of Cambrai. The division entered the recently captured line between Cantaing and Bourlon Wood on 28 November. Fierce German counter-attacks began on 30 November. Two infantry assaults were made against 176th Brigade, but both attacks were easily broken up under British artillery fire. By 4 December the decision had been made to withdraw from the Bourlon Salient, and 59th Division held covering positions while this was carried out. On 7 December the British were back on the line that they would hold for the coming winter.

==== Spring Offensive ====
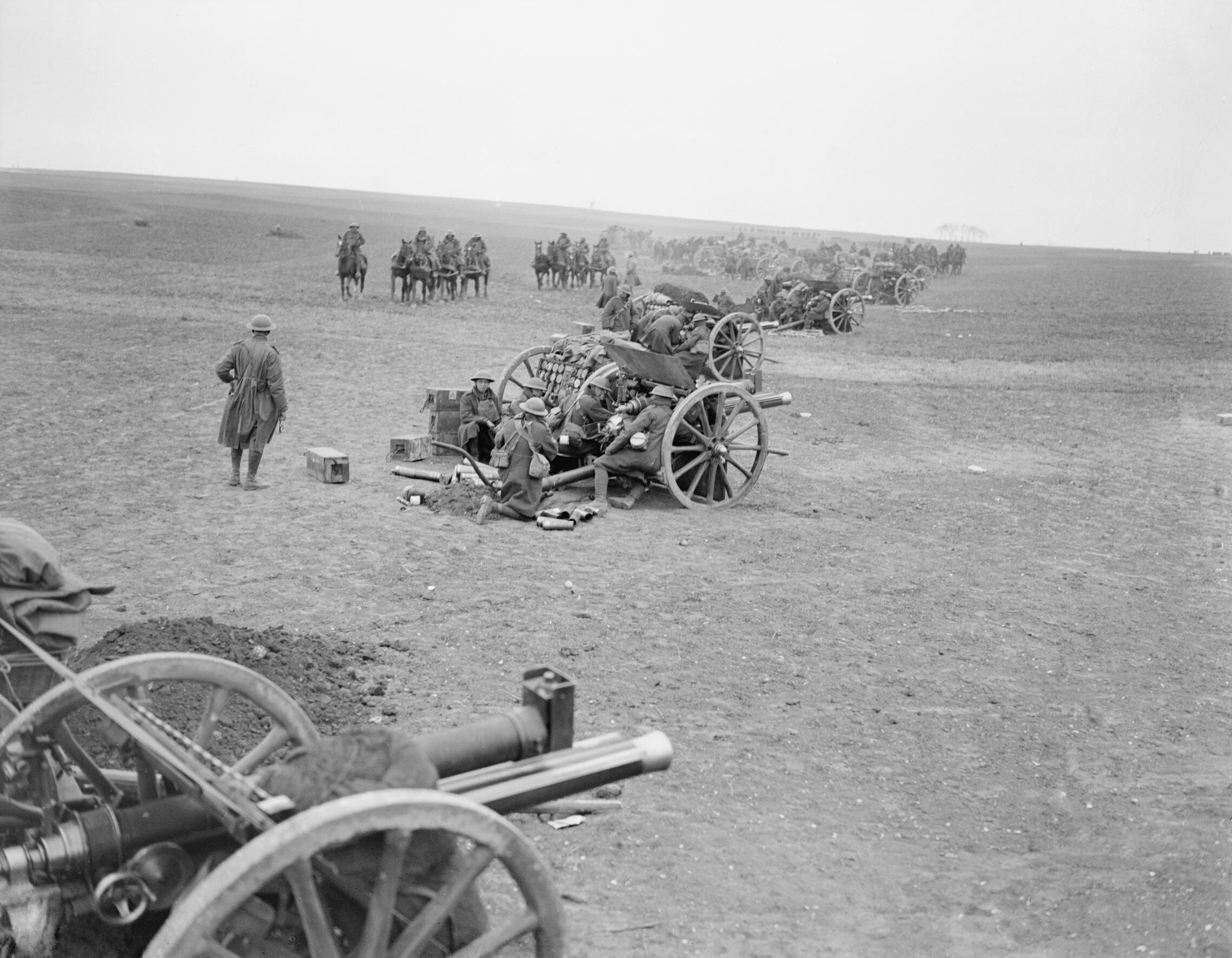
18-pounder battery in action in the open during the German Spring Offensive.

When the German spring offensive began on 21 March 1918 (the Battle of St Quentin), 59th Division was holding the Bullecourt Salient, squarely in the path of the German thrust. The situation soon became desperate, the forward brigades were almost totally destroyed, and the reserves moving up were swamped. The division's field guns in the forward zone were captured after firing over open sights at the advancing Germans. The line was held by rear details, including the gunners using rifles and Lewis guns. Only two batteries of 59th Divisional Artillery escaped, remaining in action for the next four days under the command of 40th Division, during the rest of the Battle of St Quentin and the Battle of Bapaume.

While 59th Division was withdrawn, its artillery remained in the front line, under the command of 42nd (East Lancashire) Division, with which it fought at the Battles of Arras (28 March) and the Ancre (5 April).

==== Reconstruction ====
59th Division, without its artillery, was back in the line on 14 April, when it was again in the path of a German offensive (the Battle of Bailleul) and remnants took part in the 1st Battle of Kemmel Ridge (17–18 April). By now, 59th Division's infantry had been almost destroyed. The units were reduced to training cadres and the division was later reconstructed with garrison battalions. Until June, it was employed in digging rear defences, then it underwent training to enable it to hold a sector of the front line. On 25 July, the reconstructed division went back into the line, and on 21 August it once more took part in active operations.

However, the Divisional Artillery (CCXCV and CCXCVI Brigades) remained in the Line, serving with various formations as required: 62nd (2nd West Riding) Division (15–24 April and 17 May–19 June), 37th Division (24 April–17 May), XVIII Corps (23 June–1 July), 5th Division (1–8 August) and 61st (2nd South Midland) Division (8–26 August).

==== Advance to Victory ====
The 59th Divisional Artillery rejoined its parent division on 27 August 1918. From 2 October until 11 November 1918, the division participated in the final advance in Artois and Flanders. On 2 October, 59th Division ordered two minor operations in which detachments advanced under cover of smoke and a creeping barrage; these determined that the enemy had retired, and so the division advanced against little opposition. On 16 October the division fought its way through the old defences of Lille, and liberated the city against minimal opposition the following day. Opposition stiffened at the River Schelde was approached, but this was crossed in early November.

The Armistice on 11 November found the division astride the Schelde north of Tournai. It moved to the coast to operate demobilisation centres at Dieppe, Dunkirk and Calais in early 1919, and to train drafts for continued service in Egypt and the Black Sea. 59th Divisional Artillery including CCXCVI Brigade, was demobilised on 8 August 1919.

== Interwar ==
The 2nd North Midland Bde RFA was reformed in 1920 with an additional battery (based at Stafford) from the former 3rd North Midland. On the reconstitution of the TF as the Territorial Army (TA), the 2nd was renumbered as 61st (North Midland) Bde RFA in 1921. The unit had the following composition:

- HQ at Drill Hall, Victoria Square, Shelton
- 241st (North Stafford) Field Bty at Drill Hall, Victoria Square, Shelton
- 242nd (North Stafford) Field Bty at Drill Hall, Victoria Square, Shelton
- 243rd (Leek) Field Bty (Howitzers) at Drill Hall, Leek
- 244th (Stafford) Field Bty at Drill Hall, Bailley Street, Stafford

In 1924, the RFA was subsumed into the Royal Artillery (RA), and the word 'Field' was inserted into the titles of its brigades and batteries. The establishment of a TA divisional artillery brigade was four 6-gun batteries, three equipped with 18-pounders and one with 4.5-inch howitzers, all of World War I patterns. However, the batteries only held four guns in peacetime. The guns and their first-line ammunition wagons were still horsedrawn and the battery staffs were mounted. Partial mechanisation was carried out from 1927, but the guns retained iron-tyred wheels until pneumatic tyres began to be introduced just before World War II.

In December 1936, the 46th (North Midland) Division was disbanded, and its headquarters was reconstituted as 2nd Anti-Aircraft Division. 61st (NM) Field Bde was then attached to 55th (West Lancashire) Infantry Division.

In 1938, the RA modernised its nomenclature and a lieutenant-colonel's command was designated a 'regiment' rather than a 'brigade'; this applied to TA field brigades from 1 November 1938. The TA was doubled in size after the Munich Crisis, and most regiments split to form duplicates. Part of the reorganisation was that field regiments changed from four six-gun batteries to an establishment of two batteries, each of three four-gun troops. For the North Midland regiment, this resulted in the following organisation from 15 April 1939:

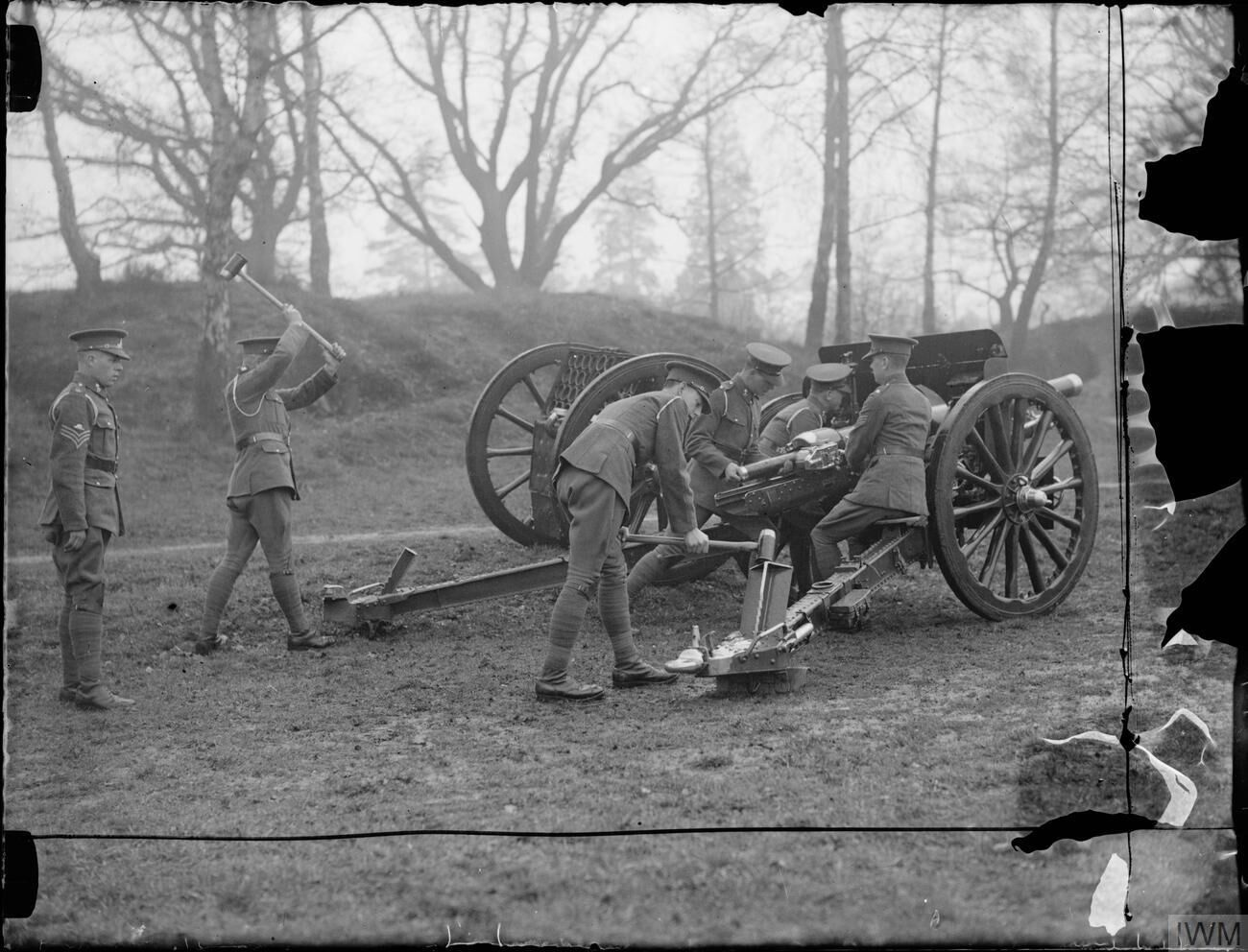
Emplacing an 18-pounder with wooden wheels at the start of World War II

61st (North Midland) Field Regiment

- Regimental Headquarters (RHQ) at Shelton
- 241 (North Stafford) Field Bty
- 242 (North Stafford) Field Bty

116th Field Regiment

- RHQ at Hanley
- 243 (Leek) Field Bty
- 244 (Stafford) Field Bty

(116th Field Rgt was authorised to use the 'North Midland' subtitle on 17 February 1942)

== World War II ==
=== 61st and 116th (North Midland) Field Regiments ===
On the outbreak of the Second World War in September 1939, both regiments were in the process of transferring to the new 59th (Staffordshire) Infantry Division being formed as a 2nd Line duplicate by 55th Division. The division served in various parts of the United Kingdom for the first part of the war, including a spell in Northern Ireland (June 1942 to March 1943).

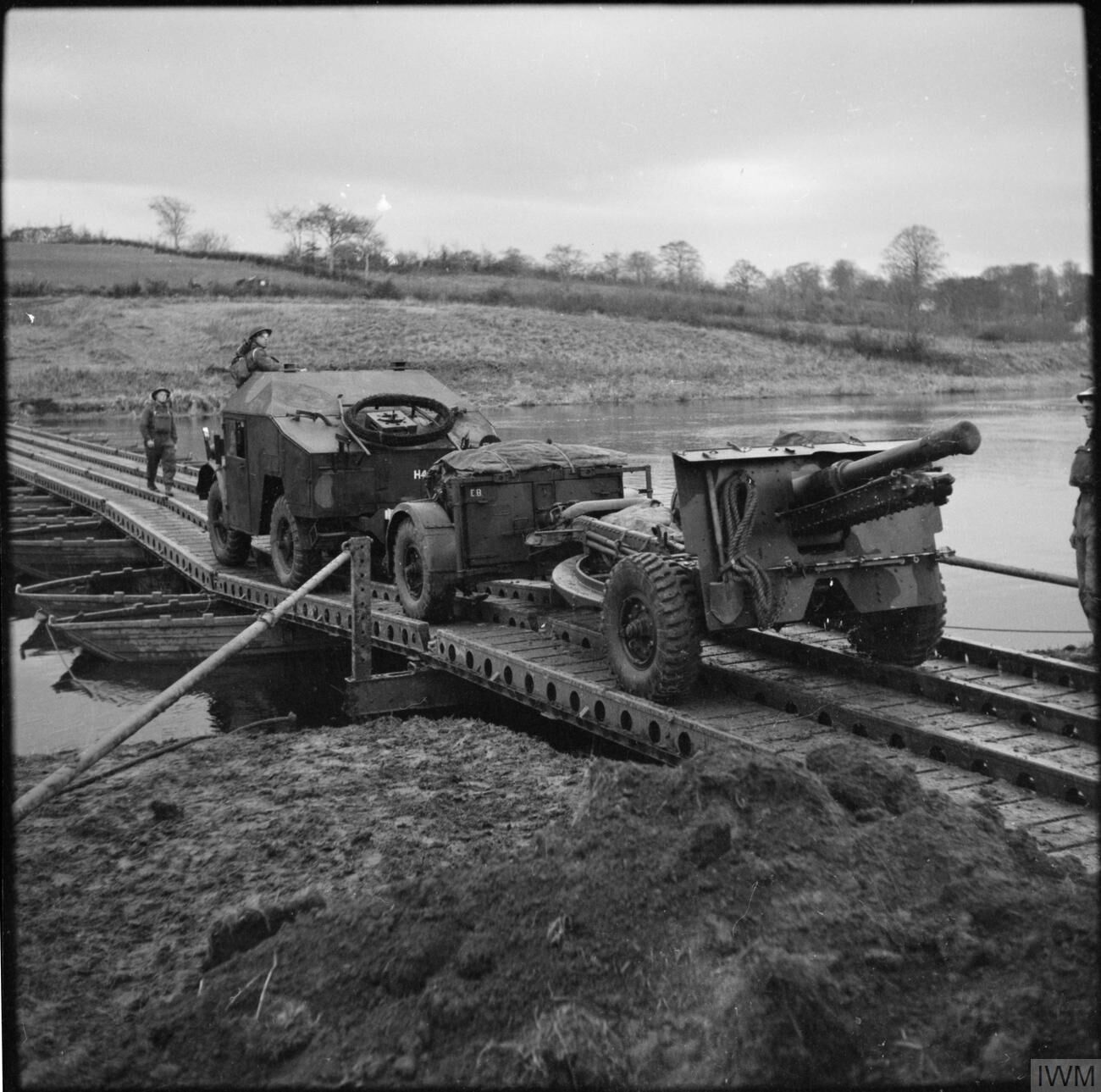
Morris C8 Quad tractor towing a 25-pdr and limber over a pontoon bridge during exercises in Northern Ireland.

One of the lessons learned from the Battle of France was that the two-battery organisation did not work: field regiments were intended to support an infantry brigade of three battalions. As a result, they were reorganised into three 8-gun batteries, but it was not until late 1940 that the RA had enough trained battery staffs to carry out the reorganisation. 61st (NM) Field Rgt accordingly formed 443 Fd Bty on 15 February 1941 and 116th Fd Rgt formed 481 Fd Bty on 14 April.

The division moved back to England on 22 March 1943 to join XII Corps in 21st Army Group, training for the Allied invasion of Normandy (Operation Overlord). It embarked on 21 June 1944 and landed in Normandy on 27 June (D + 21).

==== Normandy ====
On 8 July, 59th Division took part in a large-scale attack on Caen, Operation Charnwood, with the artillery of the attacking divisions greatly reinforced by Army Groups Royal Artillery (AGRAs), guns of the Royal Navy and heavy bombers of the Royal Air Force. The attack on the division's front was only partially successful, but after clearing up pockets of resistance it reached its objectives the next day. 59th division was then moved west of Caen and attacked again, on 15–18 July, as part of the holding operation before Operation Goodwood was launched to the east. On 6 August, the division's infantry forded the River Orne and then held off heavy counter-attacks, while its artillery supported it from across the river until bridges could be built. By 18 August, the division was pushing south as part of the northern pincer closing the Falaise Pocket.

At the end of August, the 59th Division was broken up to provide drafts for other formations, due to a severe shortage of manpower in the British Army at the time. However, the divisional field artillery was kept together as 59th Army Group Royal Artillery, serving directly under Corps and Army HQs as required, until the end of the year. The composition of AGRAs varied according to circumstances, and mainly comprised medium regiments, but 61st Field Regiment was usually included in 59th AGRA during the autumn of 1944, sometimes with 116th Field Regiment in addition.

==== Netherlands ====
In early October, 59th AGRA moved up to 'The Island', near Nijmegen, supporting first the US 101st Airborne Division, then the 2nd and 3rd Canadian Divisions in the Hoogboom area. 61 and 116 Field Regiments were absent from 59 AGRA in late October, then for most of November 59th AGRA only had 61st Field Rgt and one other under command, and was not given any targets. Then, on 30 November, news came that due to the acute shortage of infantry replacements, the formation was soon to be disbanded. Its last task was to fire in support of Operation Guildford on 3 December. This was an attack by 15th (Scottish) Infantry Division to take the Germans' last bridgehead west of the River Maas, at Blerick, opposite Venlo. It was a textbook operation, employing 21st Army Group's superior resources in airpower, engineering and artillery to overcome formidable minefields, anti-tank ditches and fortifications with low casualties. 59 AGRA was one of three AGRAs devoted to supporting the attack by a single infantry brigade (44th (Lowland) Bde), which was a complete success. On 4 December 59, AGRA moved to the Zwevegem area, where the disbandment of 59th AGRA's remaining units began in December, with the first drafts of gunners transferring to the infantry in the United Kingdom. 116 Field Regiment was one of those placed in suspended animation on 31 January 1945.

=== 61st Super Heavy Regiment ===
61st Field Regiment escaped disbandment and from 21 December 1944 was given a new role as a 'Super Heavy' regiment, equipped with US-built 240 mm howitzers and 8-inch guns. It operated these guns supporting 21st Army Group until the end of the war. It was placed in suspended animation on 15 January 1946.

== Postwar ==
When the Territorial Army was reformed in 1947, 116th (NM) Fd Rgt was disbanded, but 61st (NM) Super Hvy Rgt was reconstituted as 261 (North Midland) Observation Rgt at Stoke, forming part of 88 (Field) AGRA. It was renamed 261 (North Midland) Locating Regt in 1951.

88 AGRA was disbanded on 31 October 1956 and 261 Rgt was reduced to battery strength as 887 Locating Battery. The battery HQ was at Hanley until 1961, when it moved to Newcastle-under-Lyme.

In 1967, the unit was transferred to the Royal Armoured Corps as B (887 Locating Bty) Squadron of the Staffordshire Yeomanry (Queen's Own Royal Regiment), at Stafford; the squadron also included part of 125 Engineer Regiment Royal Engineers (originally North Midland Divisional RE). In 1969, the Staffordshire Yeomanry was reduced to a cadre, and when it was reformed two years later it was as a squadron of the Queen's Own Mercian Yeomanry and the artillery lineage disappeared.

== Honorary colonels ==
- William S. Roden, appointed 15 May 1869 (Shropshire Admin Bde)
- Henry Mapleson, VD, appointed 15 December 1883 (1st Shropshire & Staffs RGA)
- John Ryder, 5th Earl of Harrowby 1 March 1930 (former officer in the Staffordshire Yeomanry, and president of the Staffordshire TA Association)

== Insignia ==
In the late 1870s, the other ranks wore a standard artillery volunteers' brass helmet plate comprising the Royal coat of arms of the United Kingdom surmounting the gun badge of the Royal Artillery. A scroll above the gun read FIRST, and the scroll beneath read STAFFORDSHIRE ARTILLERY VOLUNTEERS.

After the TF was formed, the other ranks of the Staffordshire Batteries wore brass shoulder titles with the lettering T above RFA above STAFFORD, while the Brigade Ammunition Column wore T above RFA above NORTH MIDLAND.

== Memorials ==
There are two memorials to the 46th (North Midland) Division on the battlefield of the Hohenzollern Redoubt: one on the road between Vermelles and Hulluch, marking the jumping-off point of the attack, and one on the site of the redoubt itself, which lists all the units of the division.

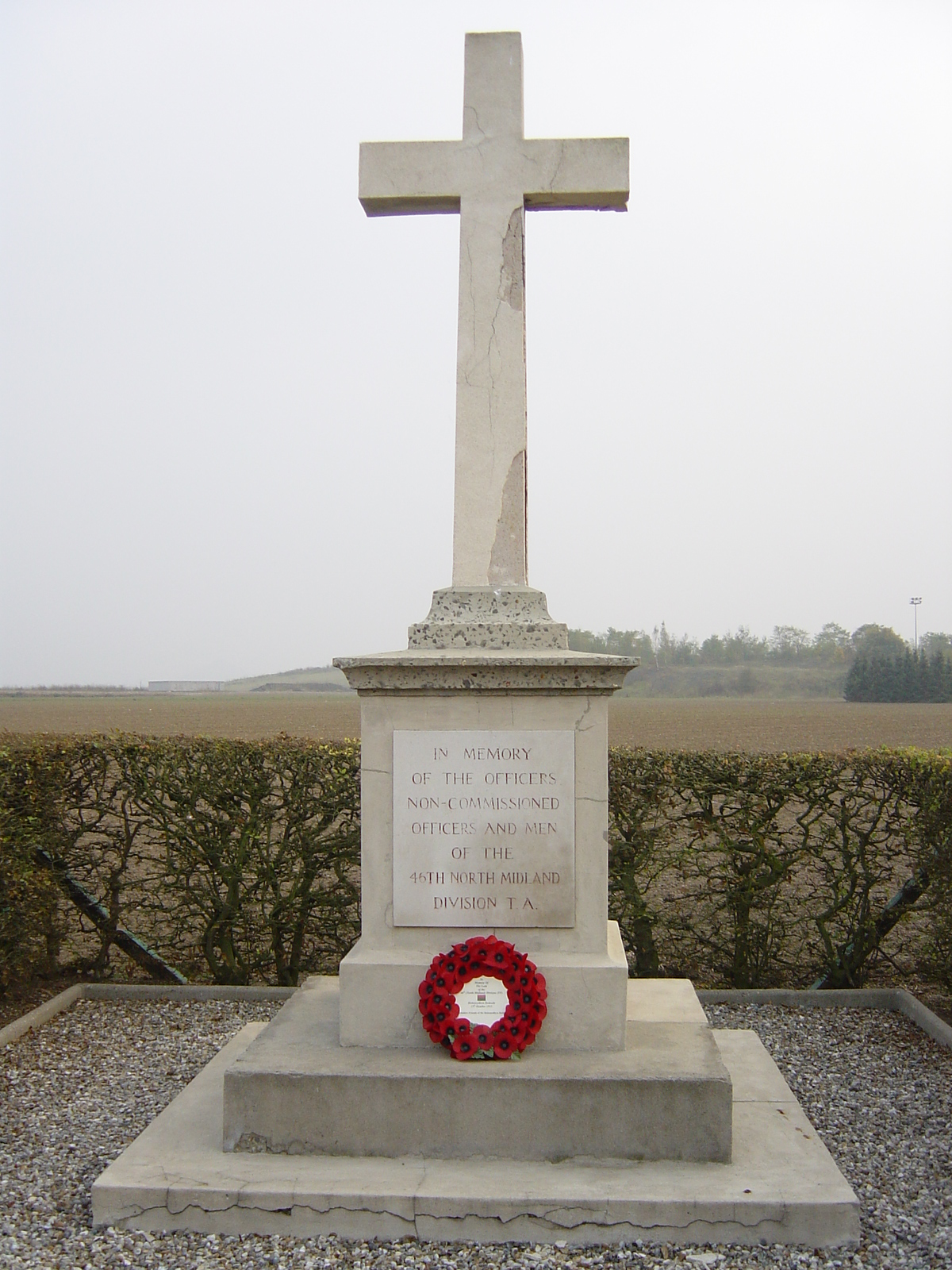
The 46th (North Midland) Division memorial on the road between Vermelles and Hulluch

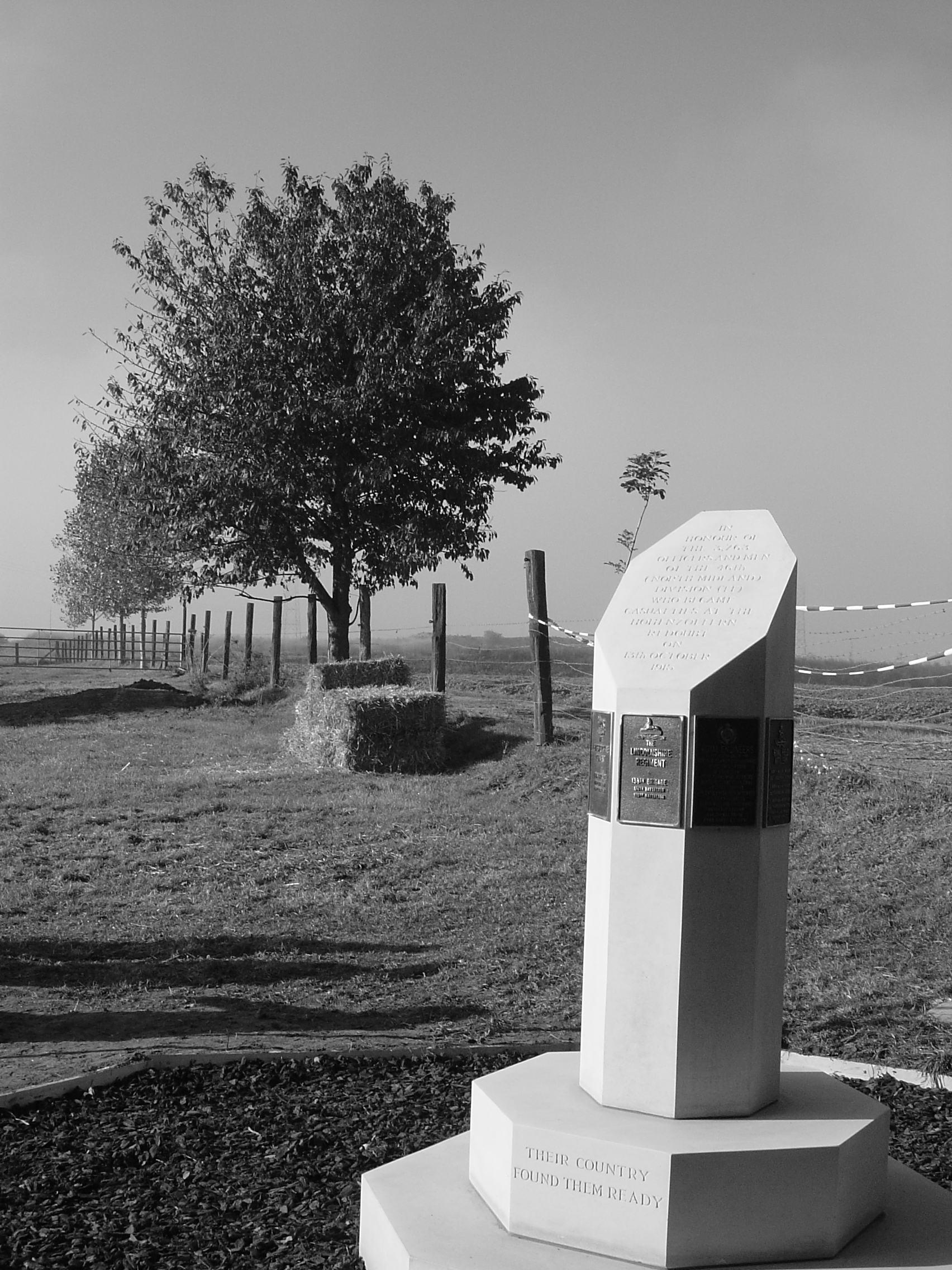
The memorial honouring the casualties of the 46th Division at the Hohenzollern Redoubt
