= Park Road East drill hall =

Building in Wolverhampton, West Midlands, England

- Wolverhampton
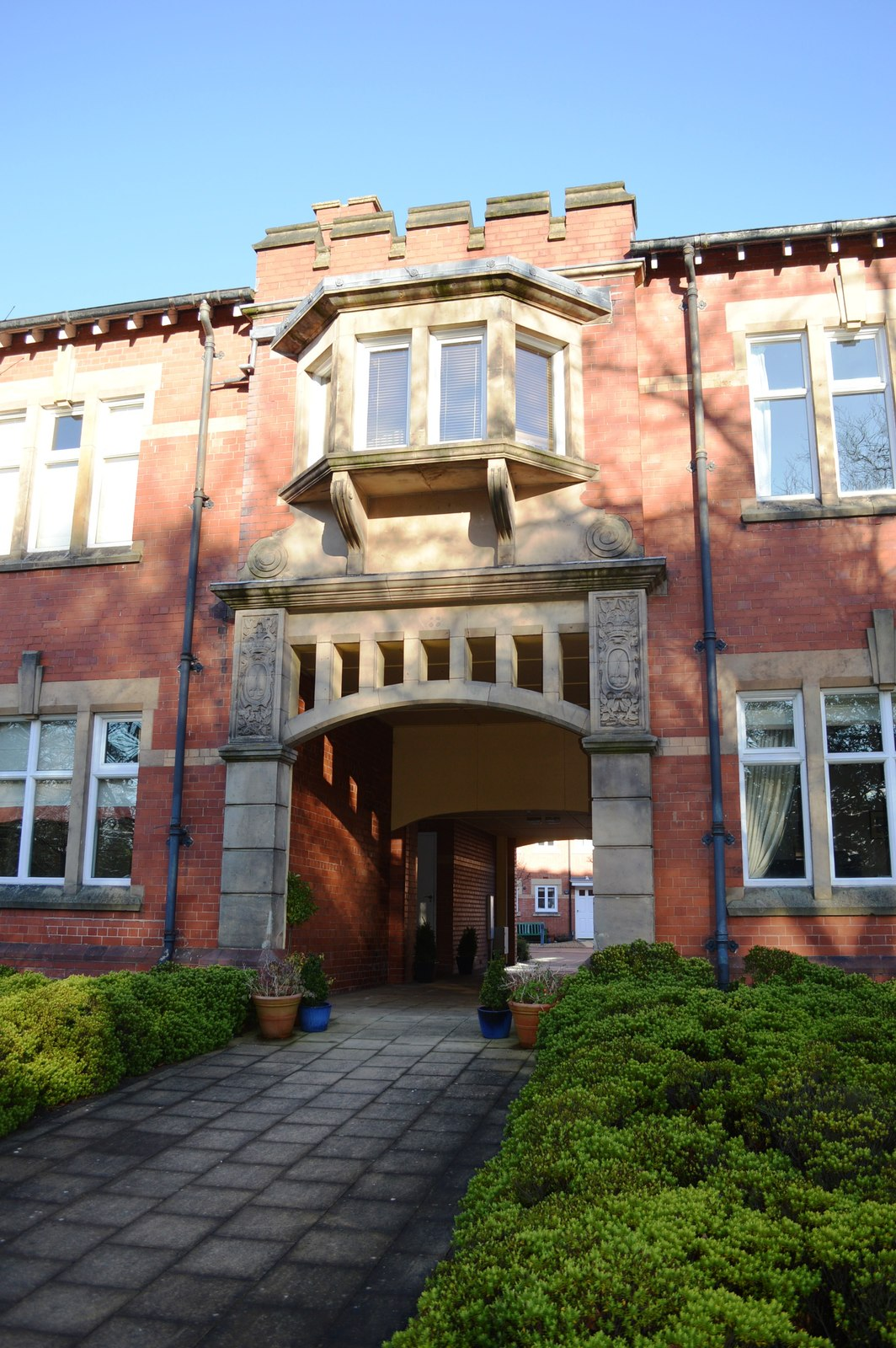
- Park Road East drill hall

Site information
- Type: Drill hall

Location
- Location within West Midlands
- Coordinates: 52.59173°N 2.13820°W

Site history
- Built: 1911
- Built for: War Office
- In use: 1911-2002

The Park Road East drill hall is a former military installation in Wolverhampton.

== History ==
The drill hall was designed as the drill hall for 'D' Squadron of the Staffordshire Yeomanry and the 4th (Staffordshire) Battery, Royal Field Artillery and opened on 1 July 1911. With the formation of the Territorial Force in 1908, the drill hall became the home of the 3rd North Midland Brigade, Royal Field Artillery. The brigade was mobilised for the First World War at the drill hall in August 1914 and, after being deployed to France and being re-designated 232 Brigade in May 1916, it saw action at the attack on the Gommecourt Salient in July 1916. After the war both 'D' Squadron of the Staffordshire Yeomanry and 232 Brigade were disbanded; the drill hall was decommissioned and converted into residential apartments in 2002.
