= Friars' Walk drill hall =

Military building in Stafford, England

- Stafford
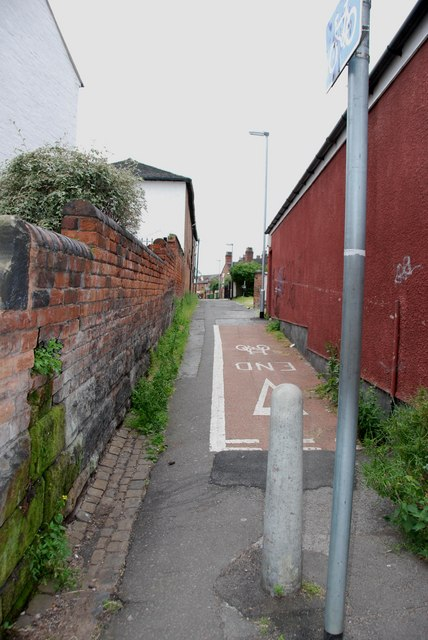
- Friars' Walk: The old drill hall is just beyond the red-bricked building (with the white side to it) on the left (it may be that this building formed part of the stabling for the drill hall)

Site information
- Type: Military headquarters

Location
- Staffordshire
- Coordinates: 52.80337°N 2.11543°W

Site history
- Built: 1913
- In use: 1913-1967

The Friars' Walk drill hall is a former military installation in Stafford.

== History ==
The building was designed by Hanley, architects, as the headquarters of the Staffordshire Yeomanry and was completed in November 1913. The drill hall also accommodated 6th Staffordshire Battery of the Royal Field Artillery (RFA). The parade ground could be accessed by guns and horses through doors in Bailey Street. The Staffordshire Yeomanry was mobilised at the drill hall in August 1914 before being deployed to Salonika. The RFA battery served on the Western Front, initially with the 46th (North Midland) Division.

After the defence cuts of 1967, which led to the transfer of the regimental headquarters to Wolverhampton, the drill hall was decommissioned and converted for use by the maintenance department of Staffordshire County Council.
