= 59th Army Group Royal Artillery =

- Active: 1944–1946
- Country: United Kingdom
- Branch: British Army
- Role: Artillery headquarters
- Engagements: North West Europe (World War II)

Commanders
- Notable commanders: Brigadier William Pike

59th Army Group Royal Artillery was an artillery formation of the British Army in World War II. Having operated in the North West Europe theatre in late 1944, it was switched to India to command artillery units preparing for the liberation of South-East Asia.

== Origin ==
The British War Office realised even before D-Day that the army's manpower situation was so bad that some formations in 21st Army Group would have to be disbanded sooner or later. At the end of August 1944 the junior infantry division, 59th (Staffordshire), was selected to be broken up to provide reinforcements for other formations. However, the Headquarters, Royal Artillery, (HQRA) and the field artillery regiments of the division were converted into an Army Group Royal Artillery (AGRA) attached directly to Second Army under the designation 59 AGRA with the following composition:

- HQ 59 AGRA
- 61st (North Midland) Field Regiment, Royal Artillery
- 110th (Manchester) Field Regiment, Royal Artillery
- 116th (North Midland) Field Regiment, Royal Artillery
- 59th AGRA Signals, Royal Corps of Signals
- 28th Artillery Company, Royal Army Service Corps

Units were regularly attached to and detached from AGRAs, so their order of battle was very fluid. For example, in the second half of October, 59 AGRA was operating with the following units under its command:

- 84th (Sussex) Medium Regiment, Royal Artillery (attached 15 October to 8 November)
- 121st Medium Regiment, Royal Artillery
- 7th Medium Regiment, Royal Canadian Artillery
- 115th Heavy Anti-Aircraft Regiment, Royal Artillery

However in early November, 61 and 110 Field Regiments returned in place of 84 and 121 Medium Regiments.

== North West Europe ==
On 8 September 1944, 59 AGRA set up its HQ at Chateau St Lubin at Louviers. Brigadier E.T. Boylan, previously Commander, Royal Artillery, (CRA) of 59 Division, left for another division and was replaced as CAGRA by Brig Harold Thicknesse from XII Corps staff, who had won a DSO with 126th (Highland) Field Regiment in the North African Campaign.

In early October, 59 AGRA moved up to 'The Island', near Nijmegen, supporting the US 101st Airborne Division. Then, on 15 October, while 59 AGRA was in action in the Hoogboom area with its units under command of 2nd and 3rd Canadian Divisions, Brig Thicknesse and his Brigade-Major, Captain D.P. Whitehorn, disappeared and were posted missing. Thicknesse was later buried in Dordrecht General Cemetery, with his date of death given as 23 October. Lieutenant-Colonel Stirling and Major Simson of 121 Medium Regiment took over as acting CAGRA and BM respectively, until 21 October, when Brig K.A. Matthews arrived from 50th (Northumbrian) Division to take over command.

On 20 October, 59 AGRA was supporting 4th Canadian Armoured Division and 2nd Canadian Division, but able to support 49th (West Riding) Division if its guns were not otherwise engaged. For most of November, with only 61 and 110 Field Regiments under command, 59 AGRA was not given any targets. Then on 30 November the commander of XII Corps, Lt-Gen Neil Ritchie, visited HQ 59 AGRA with the news that due to the acute shortage of infantry replacements, the formation was soon to be disbanded. Its last task was to fire in support of Operation Guildford on 3 December. This was an attack by 15th (Scottish) Infantry Division to take the Germans' last bridgehead west of the River Maas, at Blerick, opposite Venlo. It was a textbook operation, employing 21st Army Group's superior resources in airpower, engineering and artillery to overcome formidable minefields, anti-tank ditches and fortifications with low casualties. 59 AGRA was one of three AGRAs devoted to supporting the attack by a single infantry brigade (44th (Lowland) Bde), which was a complete success. On 4 December 59 AGRA moved to the Zwevegem area, where it exchanged 61 Field Regiment for 150th (South Nottinghamshire Hussars Yeomanry) Field Regiment at Dunkirk.

Disbandment began in December, with the first drafts of gunners transferring to the infantry in the UK. 110, 116 and 150 Field Regiments were placed in suspended animation from January 1945, while 61 Field Regiment was converted into a Super Heavy Regiment, and the Signal Section transferred to the Super Heavy Group. However, on 30 December news arrived that 59 AGRA's HQ was not being disbanded, and instead it was sent back to the UK.

== Far East ==
In February 1945 the HQ staff were put through a basic training refresher course in Norfolk under a Sergeant Instructor, then told to prepare for deployment to a tropical location. Colonel W.G.H. Pike, who had commanded 77th (Highland) Field Regiment in the Tunisian Campaign, was promoted to Brigadier and appointed to command 59 AGRA. The HQ staff embarked on HMT Mauretania at Liverpool on 28 March and disembarked at Bombay on 20 April. In May they moved up to Ranchi under Eastern Command (India) and began training exercises for units under the AGRA's command.

From 18 May 1945, 59 AGRA had the following order of battle:

- 1st Medium Regiment, Royal Indian Artillery (16 guns)
- 85th (City of London) Medium Regiment, RA (16 guns)
- 208th (SP) Field Regiment, RA (24 self-propelled guns)
- 69th Light Anti-Aircraft Regiment, RA (54 40mm Bofors guns)
- 44th Survey Battery, RA (of 2nd Survey Regiment, Royal Artillery)
- 86th (Cornwall) Medium Regiment, RA – joined on 15 July 1945

During July 1945, 59 AGRA and its units were engaged in waterproofing their equipment and training for an amphibious landing on the coast of Malaya (Operation Zipper) after the monsoon. However, the Surrender of Japan on 15 August put an end to this plan.

After the war, 59 AGRA appears to have been transferred to the Indian Army in 1946, becoming 59 Army Group Royal Indian Artillery, retitled 2 Army Group RIA the following year.

== Online sources ==
- Commonwealth War Graves Commission
- Geoff Sullivan's compilations at 'Hut Six'
- The Royal Artillery 1939–45
