= Army Group Royal Artillery =

Former British Commonwealth military unit

The cap badge of the Royal Artillery

An Army Group Royal Artillery (AGRA) was a British Commonwealth military formation during the Second World War and shortly thereafter. Generally assigned to Army corps, an AGRA provided the medium and heavy artillery to higher formations within the British Army.

== Background ==
The First World War had been the first artillery war, in which the British Royal Artillery (RA) advanced enormously in technological and tactical sophistication. Independent Heavy and Siege batteries of the Royal Garrison Artillery (RGA) were grouped into Heavy Artillery Groups, later termed brigades, under the command of a lieutenant-colonel, at the disposal of Army Corps. Despite much debate, no higher organisational command structure was evolved.

By the time of the Second World War, the RGA had been integrated into the RA, and brigades of heavy and siege guns became regiments of medium and heavy artillery, with more modern equipment. There was still an absence of a higher command structure, and a need for one for the central control of artillery above the division had become apparent to the British Expeditionary Force during the Battle of France in 1940 and in the early part of the Western Desert Campaign.

== Concept ==
The AGRA concept was developed during Exercise Bumper held in the UK in 1941, organised by General Alan Brooke (a gunner), the commander of Home Forces, with Lieutenant-General Bernard Montgomery as chief umpire. This large anti-invasion exercise tested many of the tactical concepts that would be used by the British Army in the latter stages of the war. The RA developed what became the AGRA, a powerful artillery brigade, usually comprising three medium regiments and one field regiment, which could dominate the battlefield and have the fire power for counter-battery bombardments.

AGRAs were improvised until 26 November 1942, when they were officially sanctioned, to consist of a commander and staff to control non-divisional artillery.

== Service ==
AGRAs made their debut with First Army in the Mediterranean Theatre of Operations and the concept was adopted during the North West Europe and Far East campaigns.

An AGRA usually had three medium artillery regiments, one heavy artillery regiment and one field artillery regiment. It was commanded by a brigadier and was transferred at need from corps to corps within an army. Each corps in the line usually had an AGRA and when especially heavy fire support was needed, one AGRA could be used to reinforce another, as in Operation Baytown, the initial attack on the Italian mainland, when two AGRAs fired across the Straits of Messina from Sicily or in Operation Undergo, the battle for Calais in 1944. As the British Army manpower shortage developed, the weight of fire that an AGRA could add to an attack became increasingly important.

AGRAs were not originally provided with their own Royal Electrical and Mechanical Engineers (REME) workshops, and experience proved that this was a mistake in theatres with limited support services, such as the Italian Front. Switching large groupings of artillery from one corps to another put immense strain on the corps' own REME, and later the AGRAs in Italy were provided with their own workshops, though not specifically attached to any particular AGRA.

== Commonwealth AGRAs ==
Canadian corps artillery was also referred to as an AGRA and was composed of units of the Royal Canadian Artillery as well as the Royal Artillery. Canada had two AGRAs in the Second World War, one in Italy as part of I Canadian Corps and North West Europe from March 1945 and the other only in North West Europe with II Canadian Corps.

After the war, 59th AGRA appears to have been transferred to the British Indian Army in 1946, becoming 59 Army Group Royal Indian Artillery, retitled 2 Army Group RIA the following year. At Independence in 1947, the order of battle of the RIA included 1 AGRIA, 2 AGRIA and 11 AGRIA (AA). There were at least three Royal Pakistan Artillery AGRAs - 1, 2, and 3 AGRPAs. 5 Heavy AA Regiment Indian Artillery, on transfer to Pakistan, became part of 2 AGRPA.

== List of AGRAs during the Second World War ==
Where known, with area of operation and dates formed and disbanded.

- 1st AGRA – formed 29 August 1942 at Hamilton Park, Glasgow; Tunisia and Italy; redesignated 3 AGRA (Field) 1 January 1947, disbanded in Central Mediterranean Forces (CMF) 29 October 1947
- 2nd AGRA – formed 28 August 1942 at Scotch Corner Hotel, Darlington; Tunisia and Italy; redesignated postwar as HQ 180 Infantry Brigade
- 3rd AGRA – formed at 49 Frant Road,

The cap badge of the Royal Artillery An Army Group Royal Artillery (AGRA) was a British Commonwealth military formation during the Second World War and shortly thereafter. Generally assigned to Army corps, an AGRA provided the medium and heavy artillery to higher formations within the British Army.

Tunbridge Wells, 11 February 1943; North-West Europe, usually attached to XII Corps; disbanded in British Army of the Rhine (BAOR) 15 August 1946

- 4th AGRA – formed at Clyde Hotel, Bothwell, Lanarkshire, 22 February 1943; North-West Europe, usually attached to I Corps; disbanded in BAOR 18 February 1946
- 5th AGRA – formed in Italy 11 February 1943 as HQ AGRA; numbered 17 March 1943; North-West Europe, usually attached to XXX Corps; disbanded in BAOR 15 April 1946
- 6th AGRA – formed in Middle East 15 March 1943 as 'B' HQ AGRA, numbered 17 March 1943; Italy; disbanded in CMF 1 November 1945
- 7th AGRA – formed in Paiforce as 'P' HQ AGRA 13 January 1943, numbered 22 March 1943; Italy; redesignated postwar as HQ 181 Infantry Brigade in CMF
- 8th AGRA – formed at Brandeston Hall, Woodbridge, Suffolk, 1 May 1943 from HQ RA 54th (East Anglian) Infantry Division; North-West Europe, usually attached to VIII Corps; disbanded 20 November 1945
- 9th AGRA – formed at Brodsworth Hall, Doncaster, 1 May 1943 from HQ RA 79th Armoured Division; North-West Europe attached to 21st Army Group; disbanded in BAOR 15 April 1946
- 10th AGRA – formed in Middle East as 'C' AGRA 1 June 1943, numbered 10 July 1943; Italy; units absorbed by 7th AGRA March 1945; HQ disbanded in UK 3 October 1945
- 11th AGRA – formed 1944; Far East
- 15th AGRA – formed 1944; Middle East
- 16th AGRA – formed at Harrogate 23 August 1943 from HQ Northumbrian District (Artillery) 28 August 1943; Far East; disbanded 1 January 1947
- 17th AGRA – formed from HQ Super Heavy Group RA, 7 March 1945; North West Europe; disbanded in BAOR 9 January 1946
- 18th AGRA – formed at Sefton Park, Buckinghamshire, 28 March 1945; disbanded 27 September 1945
- 59th AGRA – formed 25 August 1944 from HQ RA 59th (Staffordshire) Infantry Division; North-West Europe and Far East
- 60th AGRA – formed in India 20 August 1945 from 9th Anti-Aircraft (AA) Brigade; Far East
- 61st AGRA – formed in India 20 August 1945 from 24th AA Brigade; Far East
- 1st Canadian Army Group Royal Artillery – Italy, North-West Europe (from March 1945)
- 2nd Canadian Army Group Royal Artillery – North-West Europe usually attached to II Canadian Corps

The 107th Anti-Aircraft Brigade acted as an AGRA during the Siege of Dunkirk in 1944–45, controlling field and medium artillery as well as AA units firing in both the AA and medium roles.

== List of postwar AGRAs ==
After the Second World War, AGRAs were mainly used to control Territorial Army (TA) units, particularly AA units that did not form part of Anti-Aircraft Command. Later, a few were created in the regular Army for the British Army of the Rhine (BAOR).

- 1 AGRA (Field) – formed at Troon, Ayrshire, 31 May2 1955 from 68 AA Brigade (the wartime 42nd AA Brigade); joined BAOR 1958; became 1 Artillery Brigade 4 October 1961
- 2 AGRA (AA) – formed 9 December 1954 from Canal Line; suspended animation 1 February 1955; reformed at Warrington as 'Y' AGRA (AA) 21 March, numbered by 15 July 1955; suspended animation at Warrington 1 April 1959, formally disbanded 1 January 1962
- 3 AGRA (Fd) – formed at Glencorse, Edinburgh 1 January 1951; redesignated 3rd Artillery Bde 4 October 1961
- 4 AGRA (Fd) – formed in BAOR 18 August 1947 from HQ RA Hamburg District; redesignated HQ RA 7th Armoured Division 1 April 1950
- 5 AGRA (AA) – formed in BAOR 1 November 1950 from HQ 5th AA Bde; suspended animation 31 March 1958, formally disbanded 1 January 1962
- 7th Army Group Royal Artillery (Anti-Aircraft) – 7 AGRA had been established in August 1944 in Italy. Postwar, it was formed at Orsett Camp, Grays, Essex, from 7 AA Bde as 'Z' AGRA (AA) 15 July 1955, numbered 1 November 1955. Watson and Rinaldi record that 7 AGRA (AA) moved to Germany in September 1961. 7 AGRA (AA) was redesignated 7th Artillery Bde (Anti-Aircraft) with its headquarters in Gutersloh the next month, on 4 October 1961. On 1 September 1977, both 1st Artillery Brigade and 7th Artillery Brigade (AA) were disbanded, and their units absorbed by the new 1st Artillery Division which had its headquarters at Dortmund. Active again as a brigade by 1999, and eventually became 7th Air Defence Group.
- 40 (AA) AGRA (TA) – formed at Warrington 1 April 1959, disbanded 1 May 1961
- 41st (Anti-Aircraft) Army Group Royal Artillery (TA) – formed at Sutton Coldfield on 1 August 1955 from 74th Anti-Aircraft Brigade as 'W' AGRA (AA). About 1955, it included 282nd (Welsh) Heavy Anti-Aircraft Regiment, Royal Artillery; 245th (Ulster) Light Anti-Aircraft Regiment, Royal Artillery; 442nd Light Anti-Aircraft Regiment, Royal Artillery; 443rd Light Anti-Aircraft Regiment, Royal Artillery; and 444th (Staffordshire) Light Anti-Aircraft Regiment, Royal Artillery. It was disbanded on 1 May 1961.
- 42 (AA) AGRA (TA) – formed at York as 'V' AGRA (AA) 1 August 1955 from 69th Anti-Aircraft Brigade. It was disbanded on 1 May 1961.
- 84 (Fd) AGRA (Highland) (TA) – formed at Aberdeen 1 January 1947; disbanded 3 June 1950
- 85 (Fd) AGRA (Lowland) (TA) – formed at Townhead, Glasgow, 1 January 1947; became HQ RA 52nd (Lowland) Division 1 July 1950
- 86 (Fd) AGRA (TA) – formed at Nottingham 1 January 1947 from HQ RA 46th Infantry Division; disbanded 31 October 1956
- 87 (Fd) AGRA (TA) – formed at Liverpool 1 January 1947 from HQ RA 55th (West Lancashire) Division; disbanded 1 May 1961
- 88 (Fd) AGRA (TA) – formed at Shrewsbury 1 January 1947; disbanded 31 October 1956
- 89 (Fd) AGRA (TA) – formed at London 1 January 1947; became HQ RA 54th (East Anglian) Division 31 October 1956
- 90 (Fd) AGRA (TA) – formed at Newbury, Berkshire, 1 January 1947; disbanded 31 October 1956
- 91 (Fd) AGRA (TA) – formed at Taunton, Somerset, 1 January 1947; disbanded 1 August 1950 Included 342 Royal Devon Yeomanry Medium Regiment RA TA.
- 92 (AA) AGRA (TA) – formed at Coventry 1 January 1947; disbanded 9 September 1948
- 93 (AA) AGRA (TA) – formed at Preston, Lancashire, 1 January 1947; became 93 AA Brigade 1 September 1948
- 94 (AA) AGRA (TA) – formed at Prestwich, Manchester, 1 January 1947; disbanded 9 September 1948
- 95 (AA) AGRA (TA) – formed at Newport, Monmouthshire, 1 January 1947; became 95 AA Brigade 1 September 1948
- 96 (AA) AGRA (TA) – formed at Liverpool 1 January 1947; disbanded at Manchester 31 October 1955
- 97 (AA) AGRA (TA) – formed at Chelsea, London, 1 January 1947; disbanded 5 December 1950
- 98 (AA) AGRA (TA) – formed at Chelmsford, Essex, 1 January 1947; disbanded 9 September 1948
- 99 (AA) AGRA (TA) – formed at Southborough, Kent, 1 January 1947; became 99 AA Brigade 1 September 1948
- 100 (AA) AGRA (TA) – formed at Winchester 1 January 1947; disbanded 9 September 1948
