= William Pike (British Army officer) =

British Army officer (1905–1993)

Lieutenant-General Sir William Pike KCB CBE DSO
- Born: 24 June 1905; Scarborough, Yorkshire, England
- Died: 10 March 1993 (aged 87); Alton, Hampshire, England
- Military career
- Allegiance: United Kingdom
- Branch: British Army
- Service years: 1925−1963
- Rank: Lieutenant-General
- Service number: 31590
- Unit: Royal Artillery
- Commands: 59th Army Group Royal Artillery; 77th (Highland) Field Regiment, Royal Artillery
- Conflicts: Second World War; Korean War; Suez Crisis
- Awards: Knight Commander of the Order of the Bath; Commander of the Order of the British Empire; Distinguished Service Order

Lieutenant-General Sir William Gregory Huddleston Pike, KCB, CBE, DSO (24 June 1905 − 10 March 1993) was a senior British Army officer who served as Vice Chief of the Imperial General Staff from 1960 to 1963.

== Military career ==
Pike entered Bedford School in 1914, and was further educated at Marlborough College.

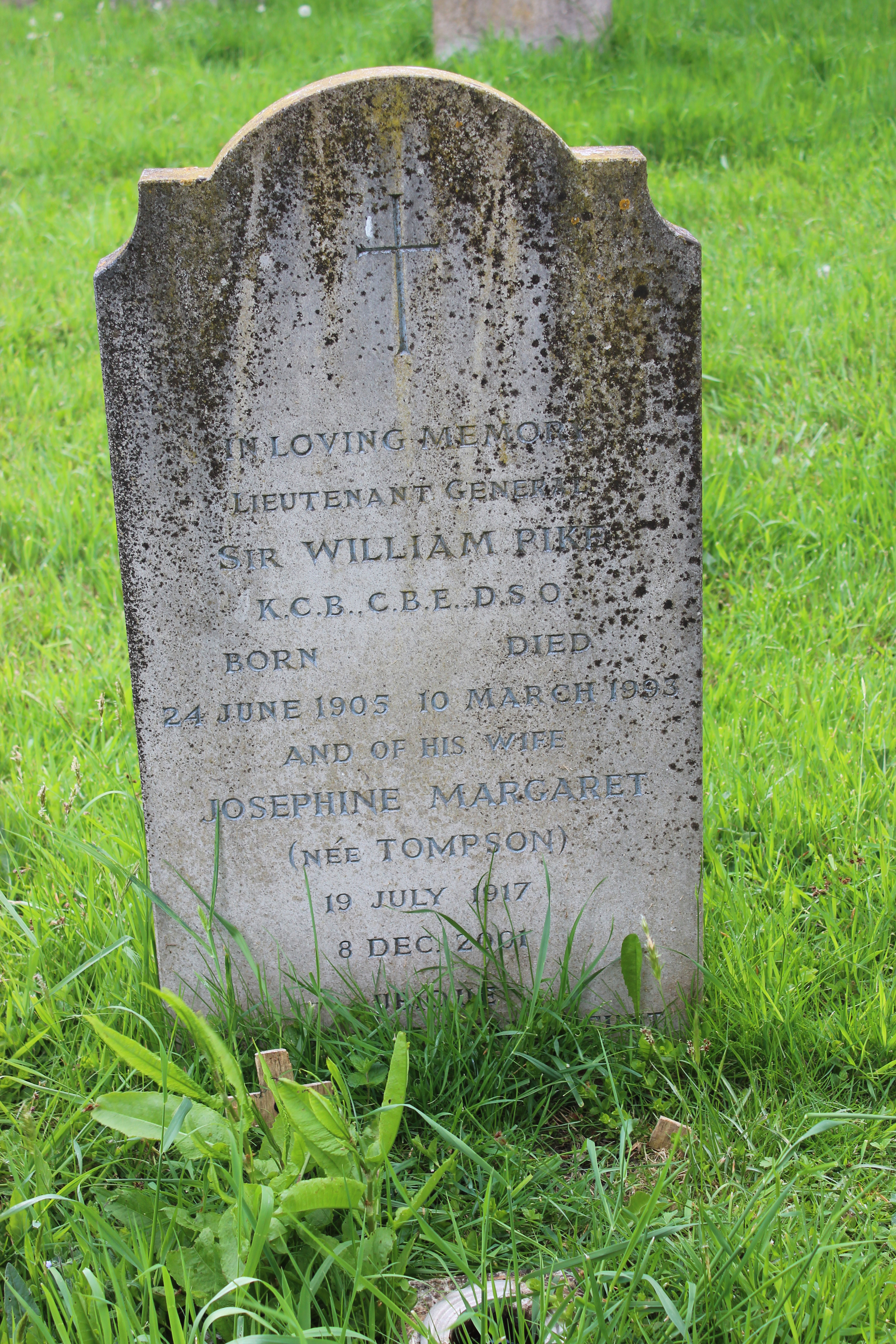
The grave of Lieutenant-General Sir William Pike in Bentley, Hampshire.

After graduating from the Royal Military Academy, Woolwich, Pike was commissioned into the Royal Artillery on 28 January 1925. He served with the British Indian Army until 1936 and fought in the Second World War taking part in the Dunkirk evacuation and commanding the 77th (Highland) Field Regiment, Royal Artillery during the landings in Morocco and Algeria in March 1943. On 11 March 1944, Pike was promoted to brigadier and appointed to command 59th Army Group Royal Artillery, a headquarters that was about to embark for the Far East. On arrival at the Ranchi training area, 59 AGRA and the artillery regiments placed under Pike's command prepared for an amphibious assault on the coast of Malaya, which was called off after the Surrender of Japan.

Pike later served in the Korean War as Divisional Commander, Royal Artillery for 1st Commonwealth Division. He was appointed Director of Staff Duties at the War Office in 1954 - a post he held during the Suez Crisis, Chief of Staff for Far East Land Forces in 1957 and Vice Chief of the Imperial General Staff in 1960 before retiring in 1963. He was also Colonel Commandant of the Royal Artillery from 1962 to 1970.

== Family ==
He married Josephine 'Josie' Tompson; their son is Lieutenant General Sir Hew Pike. His brother was Marshal of the Royal Air Force Sir Thomas Pike.

Military offices
Preceded by Sir William Stratton	Vice Chief of the Imperial General Staff; 1960–1963	Succeeded by Sir Geoffrey Baker
