= 3rd North Midland Brigade, Royal Field Artillery =

3rd North Midland Brigade, Royal Field Artillery (TF)
- Cap Badge of the Royal Artillery
- Active: 1 May 1908 – 1921
- Country: United Kingdom
- Branch: Territorial Force
- Role: Field Artillery
- Part of: 46th (North Midland) Division; 59th (2nd North Midland) Division
- Garrison/HQ: Wolverhampton
- Engagements: Hohenzollern Redoubt; Gommecourt; Messines; Third Ypres; Cambrai; German spring offensive Hundred Days Offensive

The 3rd North Midland Brigade, Royal Field Artillery was a volunteer unit of the British Territorial Force formed in 1908. It served in some of the bloodiest battles on the Western Front during World War I

== Origin ==
When the Territorial Force (TF) was created from the former Volunteer Force by the Haldane Reforms in 1908, it was organised into regional infantry divisions, each with a full establishment of Royal Field Artillery (RFA) brigades. Where there were no suitable artillery volunteer units in the region, these brigades had to be created from scratch. This was the case for the North Midland Division, for which a new III (or 3rd) Brigade (Note: The brigade was originally going to be numbered II North Midland, but this was changed in October 1908.) was raised in Staffordshire with the following composition:

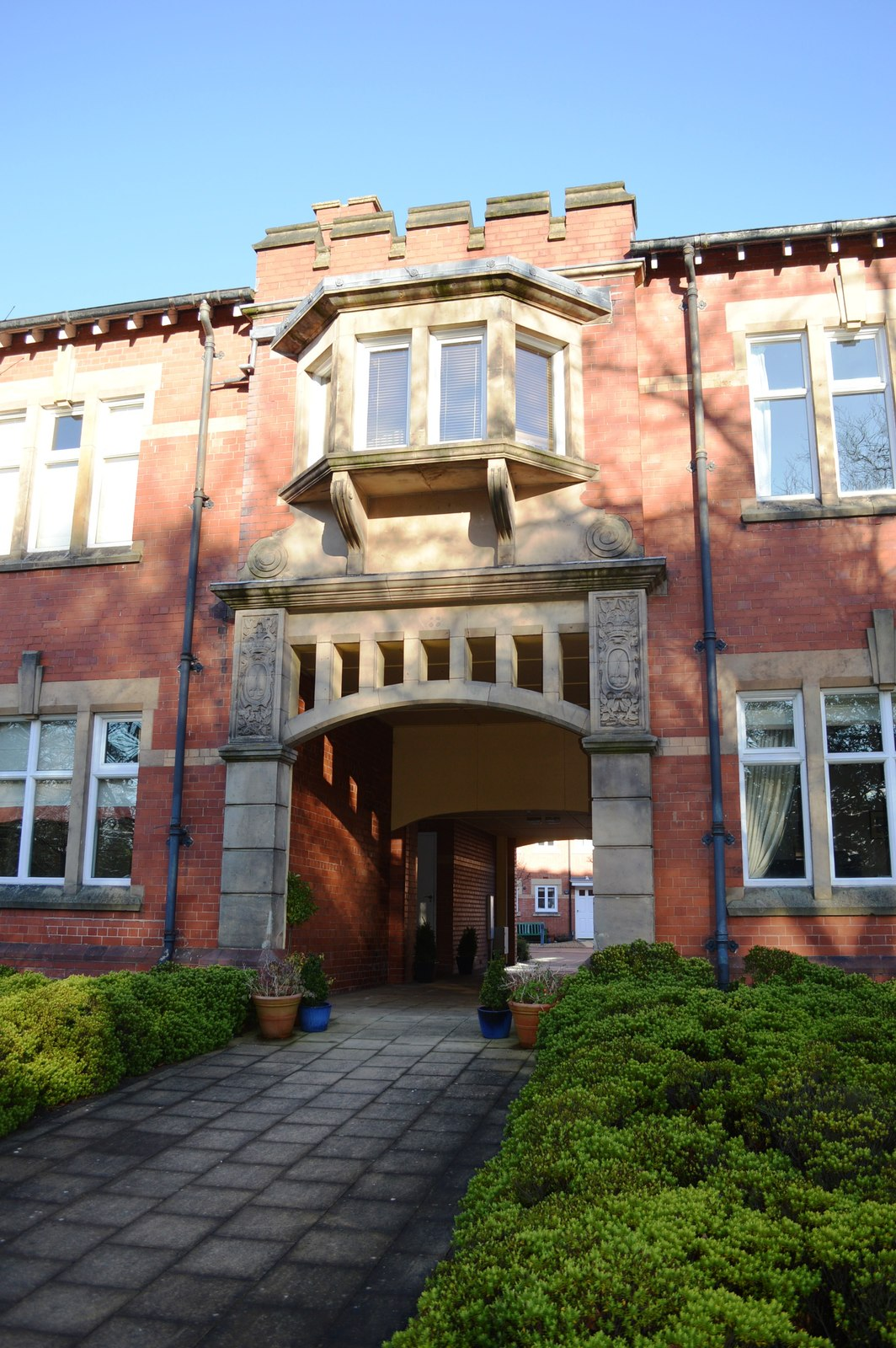
Riding School Drill Hall today

III North Midland Brigade, RFA

- HQ at Riding School Drill Hall, Park Road East, Wolverhampton
- 4th Staffordshire Battery at Wolverhampton
- 5th Staffordshire Battery at Drill Hall, Carter's Green, West Bromwich
- 6th Staffordshire Battery at Friars' Walk drill hall, Stafford
- III North Midland Ammunition Column at Wolverhampton

On the outbreak of World War I, the Commanding Officer (CO) was Lieutenant-Colonel C.C. Leveson-Gore, a retired Major in the Indian Army, appointed on 1 April 1909.

== World War I ==
=== Mobilisation ===
The order to mobilise was received on 4 August 1914. Shortly afterwards, the men were invited to volunteer for overseas service, and the majority having accepted this liability, the North Midland Division concentrated at Luton. In November it moved to the area round Bishop's Stortford where it completed its war training. At the time of mobilisation, the batteries of III North Midland Bde were each equipped with four 15-pounder guns.

The formation of reserve or 2nd Line TF units was authorised by the War Office on 31 August 1914. They began to form in September 1914 as a duplicate of the 1st: the units took a '2/' prefix to distinguish them from the 1st Line unit. The unit therefore became the 1/III and 2/III North Midland Brigade RFA (TF), the latter forming part of 2nd North Midland Division.

=== 1/III North Midland Brigade ===
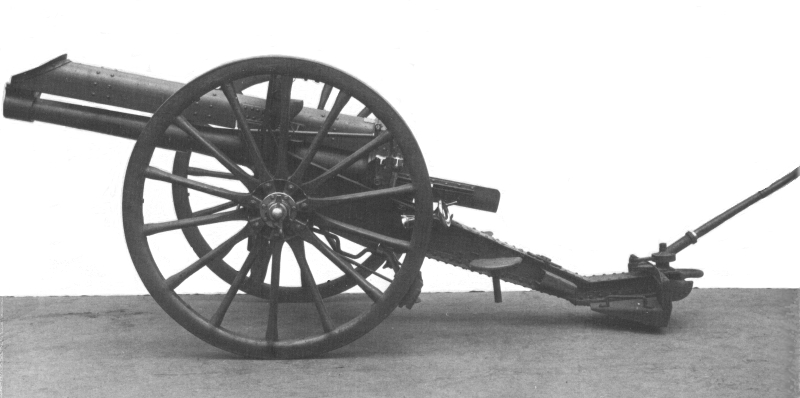
15-pounder gun

The North Midland Division began embarking for France on 25 February 1915 and, by 8 March, had completed its concentration at Ploegsteert in Belgium – the first complete TF division to deploy to the Western Front with the British Expeditionary Force (BEF). It was numbered the 46th (North Midland) Division shortly afterwards.

==== Hooge ====
Over the following months, the artillery supported the infantry in routine trench warfare in the Ypres Salient. On 19 July, the Royal Engineers exploded a mine under the German positions at Hooge, but the infantry of 3rd Division tasked with seizing the crater had not been given a supporting artillery fireplan. As the infantry were being driven out by German artillery, counter-battery fire from 46th Division's guns and other neighbouring artillery helped to rectify the situation. When the Germans attacked the Hooge crater with flamethrowers on 30 July, 139th (Sherwood Foresters) Brigade of 46th Division was able to stabilise the line with the help of the divisional artillery.

==== Hohenzollern Redoubt ====
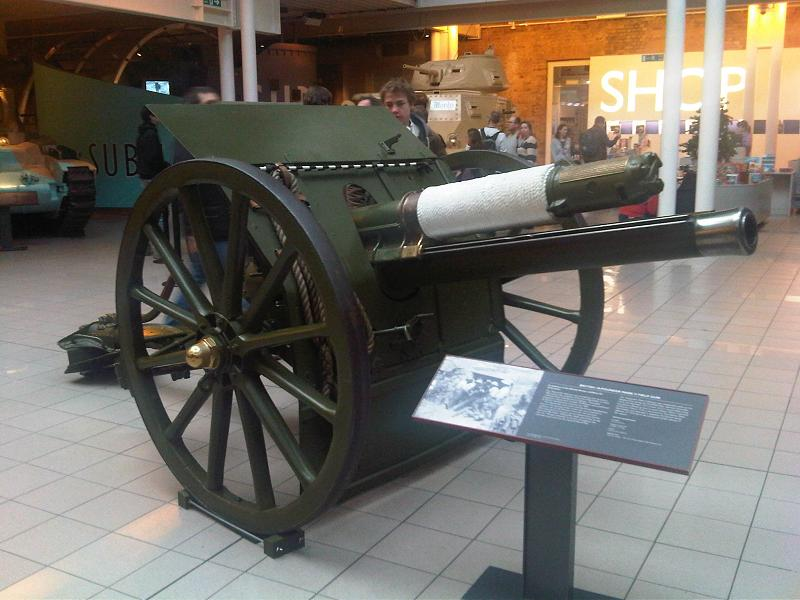
18-pounder preserved at the Imperial War Museum

46th Division's first offensive operation was the Battle of the Hohenzollern Redoubt. This was an attempt to restart the failed Battle of Loos, and the division was moved down from Ypres on 1 October for the purpose. The Germans recaptured the Hohenzollern trench system on 3 October, and the new attack was aimed at this point. The artillery bombardment (by the field guns of 46th and 28th Division, backed by heavy batteries) began at 12.00 on 13 October and the infantry went in at 14.00 behind a gas cloud. The attack was a disaster, most of the leading waves being cut down by machine gun and shell fire from German positions that had not been suppressed by the bombardment. 1/III NM Brigade was re-equipped with 18-pounder guns in November. On 23 December, the 46th (NM) Division was ordered to embark for Egypt. It entrained for Marseille, and some of the infantry had actually reached Egypt before the order was rescinded on 21 January 1916. The artillery returned from Marseille and the whole division reassembled on the Western Front near Amiens by 14 February.

==== Gommecourt ====
On 1 May 1916, the division was ordered into the line facing Gommecourt in preparation for the forthcoming Somme Offensive. Over the first ten days of the month, the divisional artillery took over the existing battery positions along this front and began digging additional gun pits, observation posts (OPs) and dugouts to new designs. During this period, the field brigades of the BEF were reorganised. On 4 May 1916, an extra battery of four 18-pounders was formed and, on 13 May, the brigade was assigned a number as CCXXXII (232) Brigade, RFA, the batteries being redesignated A, B, C and D. Then, on 23 May, the new D Bty was exchanged for the former 2nd Derbyshire Howitzer Bty of CCXXXIII (4th NM) Bde, equipped with 4.5-inch howitzers, which became D (H) Bty. Lastly, the Brigade Ammunition Columns were merged into the Divisional Ammunition Column.

Preparations were under way for the 46th and 56th (1st London) Divisions to carry out an Attack on the Gommecourt Salient as a diversion from the main offensive further south. 46th Division would attack from the north west, converging with 56th from the south west. On 18 June, 46th Divisional artillery was allocated its tasks for wire-cutting and registration of targets ahead of the attack. It was divided into two groups: CCXXXII and CCXXXI (2nd NM) Brigades formed the Left group, under the command of Lt-Col Sir Smith Hill Child, 2nd Baronet, of CCXXXI. This group supported the attack of 139th Brigade, which was to be made by two battalions (1/5th and 1/7th (Robin Hoods) Sherwood Foresters) over a frontage of 520 yards into an area of dead ground in front of Gommecourt Wood where the German wire entanglements could not be seen by artillery observers.

46th Division used a high proportion of its 18-pounder ammunition to bombard enemy trenches and lines of communication, and a smaller proportion (about 27 per cent) of shrapnel shells to cut the German wire. The results of this bombardment were patchy. The Germans reported that in this area their 'front trenches were levelled and the wire shot away' but their casualties had been few because of their deep dugouts, and when the attack went in on 1 July their men emerged to receive the attack with heavy machine-gun and rifle fire.

Apart from the wire-cutting batteries, the divisional artillery was under the direction of VII Corps during the preliminary bombardment, which began on 24 June, but at zero hour it reverted to divisional control. Once the infantry went 'over the top', the field guns were to make a series of short 'lifts', almost amounting to a 'creeping barrage'.

A final 'whirlwind' bombardment by all the guns began at 06.25 on 1 July and at zero hour (07.30) 139th Bde made its attack. The men broke into the first German trench and some parties reached the second, but overall the attack was a bloody failure, as was the whole Gommecourt action. Attempts to reinforce 139th Brigade during the afternoon broke down and the Germans retook the positions lost.

==== Reorganisation ====
The Gommecourt attack had been a diversion, and it was not renewed after the first day's disaster. 46th Division remained in position while the Somme offensive continued further south throughout the summer and autumn. There was further reorganisation amongst divisional artillery, resulting in C Bty being broken up on 28 August 1916, with Right Section going to A Bty and Left Section to B Bty to bring them up to six guns each. On 27 October, 512 (H) Bty joined from England and became C (H) Bty. A final round of reorganisation came in the new year, when the brigade left 46th Division and became an Army Field Brigade. Before it left on 3 January 1917, the former 512 (H) Bty was broken up among the other North Midland brigades and was replaced by a battery from CCXLVII Brigade (of 49th (West Riding) Division, TF) that was also being broken up. At the same time a half-battery of howitzers came from the same brigade, although it had originally been a Kitchener's Army battery raised in Huddersfield. For the remainder of the war the brigade had the following organisation.

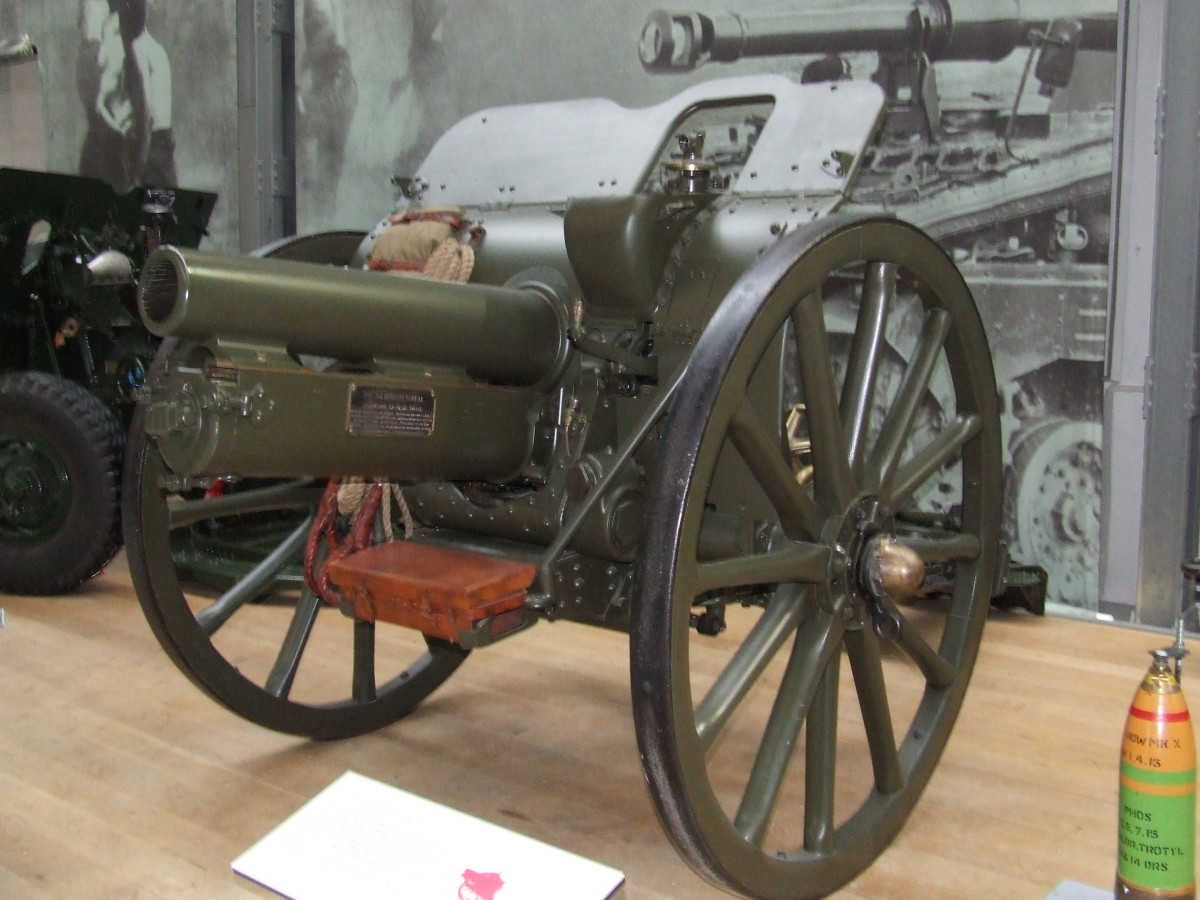
4.5-inch howitzer preserved at the Royal Artillery Museum

- A/CCXXXII (4th Staffordshire Bty + Right Section 6th Staffordshire Bty) 6 x 18-pdrs
- B/CCXXXII (5th Staffordshire Bty + Left Section 6th Staffordshire Bty) 6 x 18-pdrs
- C/CCXXXII (9th West Riding Bty + Section 8th West Riding Bty) 6 x 18-pdrs
- D (H)/CCXXXII (2nd Derbyshire Bty + Section from Huddersfield) 6 x 4.5-inch howitzers

The role of an Army Field Artillery (AFA) brigade was to reinforce sectors of the front as required, without breaking up divisional artilleries. CCXXXII Brigade actually remained with 46th Division in early 1917 (with just a few days attached to 58th (2/1st London) Division), including the period following up the German retreat to the Hindenburg Line (Operation Alberich). On 19 March, it was transferred to 14th (Light) Division on the same operations. Then, on 13 April, it joined 50th (Northumbrian) Division for the capture of Wancourt Ridge during the Arras Offensive. As the offensive continued, it switched to 15th (Scottish) Division for the capture of Guémappe (23 April) and then to 56th (1st London) Division for the Third Battle of the Scarpe (3–4 May).

==== Messines ====
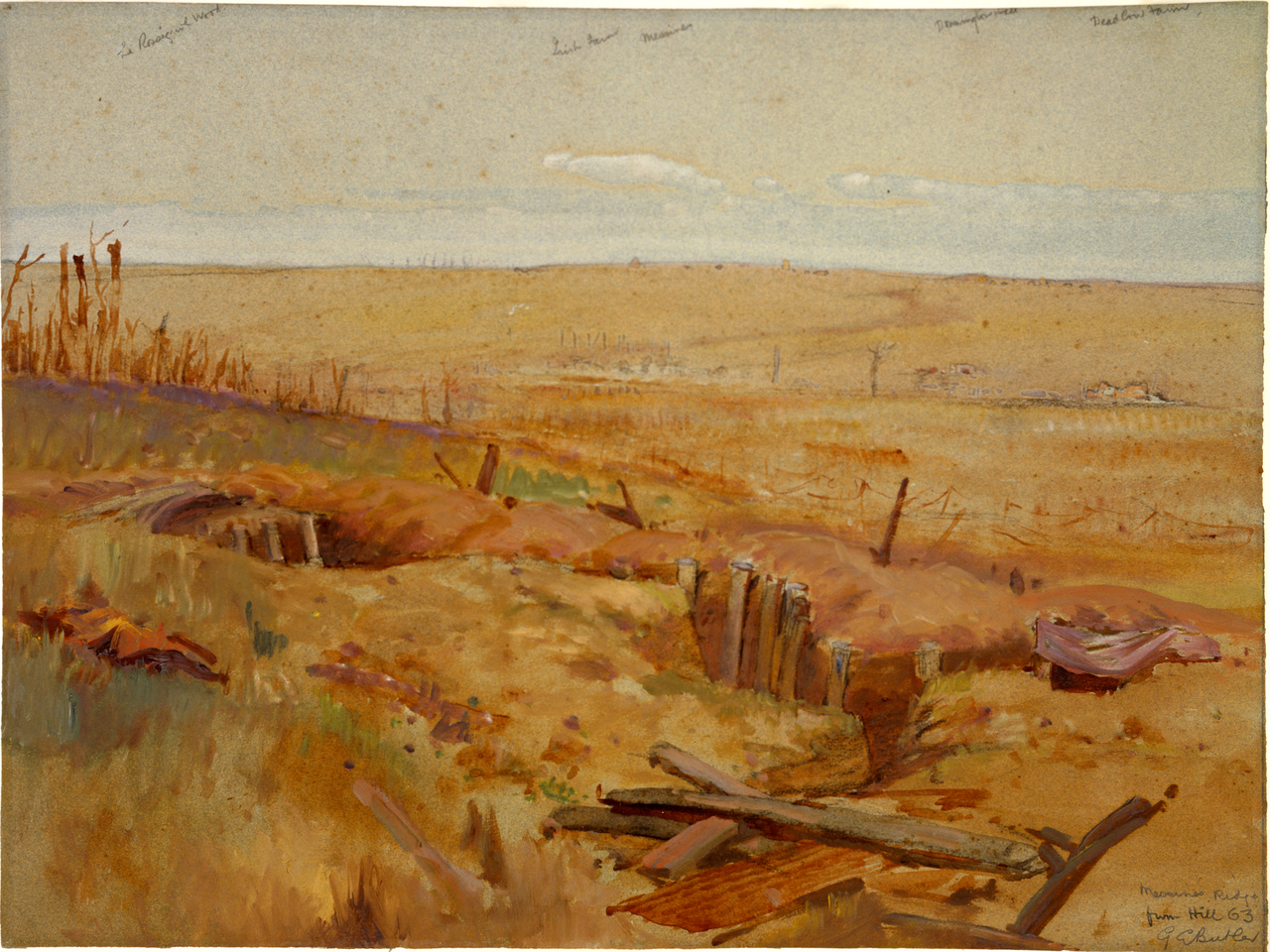
Messines Ridge from Hill 63 by George Edmund Butler

CCXXXII Brigade was rested from 5 to 24 May, then joined 19th (Western) Division in IX Corps as it was preparing for the Battle of Messines. The AFA brigades were moved into the area in secrecy, a battery at a time. Ammunition dumps had been formed containing 1000 rounds for each 18-pounder and 750 for each 4.5-inch howitzer, together with thousands of rounds of gas and smoke shells. The preparatory bombardment began on 26 May and the creeping barrage was practised on 3 and 5 June, inducing the Germans to reveal many of their own batteries, which were then bombarded. The guns ceased fire at 02.40 on 7 June and then the attack was launched at 03.10 with the firing of a series of massive mines under the Messines Ridge. The infantry advanced behind a creeping barrage (about two-thirds of the 18-pounders) protected by a standing barrage (the 4.5-inch howitzers and remaining 18-pounders) 700 yards (640 m) further in front. Once the infantry reached their objectives, the creeping barrage became a protective barrage 150–300 yards ahead of them while they consolidated their positions. The plan worked to perfection, and there was scarcely any opposition to the initial attack from the stunned defenders. Some field batteries then moved forward into the old no-man's land to extend the protective barrage. This smashed the first German counter-attack launched at 14.00, and the British second phase attack was launched in the afternoon, taking its objectives.

==== Third Ypres ====
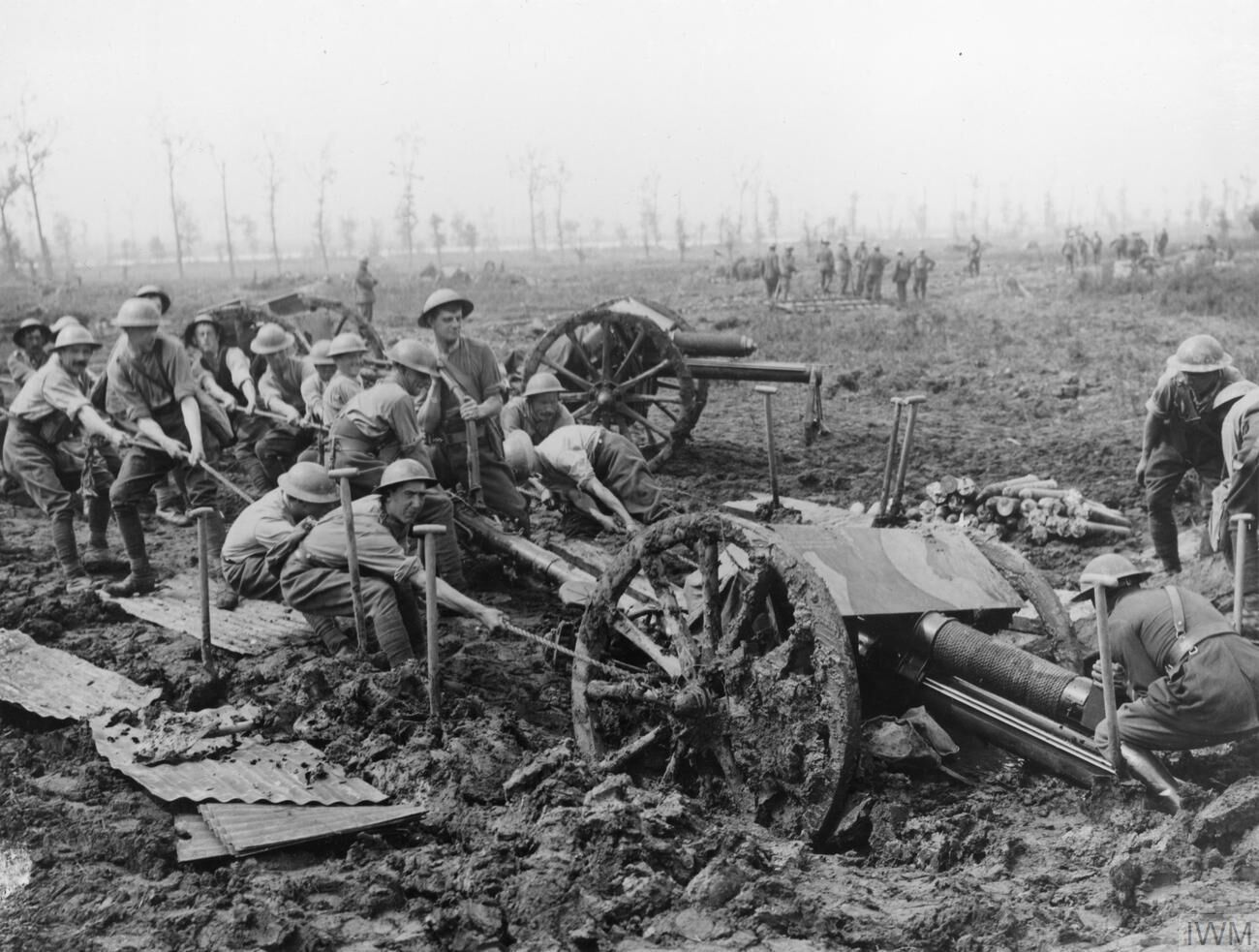
18-pounder in mud during the Third Ypres offensive, 1917

The brigade next (12 June) joined II Corps in the Ypres Salient. II Corps was preparing for the opening of the Third Ypres Offensive, and CCXXXII AFA Bde was allocated to 8th Division from 30 June. Each division in II Corps had 44 batteries or 264 field guns attached to it, packed wheel to wheel between Zillebeke and Verbrandenmolen. The attack was due on 25 July (postponed to 31 July) but the bombardment had begun on 12 June, and over ensuing weeks the British guns suffered heavy casualties from German counter-battery fire. The offensive opened with the Battle of Pilckem Ridge on 31 July. Once again, the field guns supplied the creeping barrage and standing barrage. Attacking into 'Chateau Wood', 8th Division got held up and left behind as the barrage advanced to timetable. The rest of the attack was a partial success, but II Corps' failure led to the development of a dangerous salient. Casualties among the gunners rose over the following days as they struggled amongst the mud to bombard the German line for a renewed attack and CCXXXII AFA Bde was withdrawn for rest on 13 August before the next attack went in.

When CCXXXII AFA Bde returned to the line on 23 August, first with XIX Corps and then V Corps it was not directly involved in the continuing offensive. But, on 16 September, it was transferred to 55th (West Lancashire) Division for the Battle of the Menin Road Ridge (20–25 September). New artillery tactics involved five belts of fire, the first two fired by 18-pounders, the third by 4.5-inch howitzers, moving at a slow pace with frequent pauses to allow the infantry to keep up. Batteries also had the task of swinging off to engage targets of opportunity, and had spare detachments to avoid exhaustion of the gunners. The barrage was described as 'magnificent both in accuracy and volume', German counter attacks were broken up by shellfire, and the attack was a resounding success.

CCXXXII AFA Brigade then switched to 59th (2nd North Midland) Division for the successful Battle of Polygon Wood (26–30 September). While that battle was continuing, 59th Division came under the command of II ANZAC Corps, and on 1 October the brigade was transferred to the New Zealand Division, which fought through the Broodseinde (4 October), and 1st Passchendaele (12 October). The conditions were becoming increasingly impossible and the quality of artillery support diminished. The Commander, Royal Artillery, of the New Zealand Division stated that he could not take part in the attack of 12 October because it was impossible to move the batteries across the Steenbeck, but he was ignored. The barrage was poor and the New Zealanders suffered heavy casualties.

==== Cambrai ====
The brigade was withdrawn on 21 October before the fighting at Ypres was over, and moved south to join III Corps for the Battle of Cambrai. Although the battle is famous for the first mass use of tanks, the plan was also notable for employing a massive surprise artillery barrage at zero hour with no preceding bombardment or registration. No wire-cutting fire was required because the tanks would crush it. The batteries were secretly moved into position in the days before the attack, CCXXXII AFA Bde joining 12th (Eastern) Division on 13 November. They opened fire at 06.20 on 20 November and 12th Division moved forward behind its tanks towards the Bonvais Ridge. The speed of the barrage was adjusted to the likely speed of the attackers up or down hill, with pauses for each phase. According to plan the barrage lifted at 08.50 to the Lateau Trench, then the next lift fell behind Bonvais Farm to leave the buildings intact, to be dealt with by the tanks. Finally the field artillery brought down a protective barrage behind the final objectives on the Brown Line. III Corps' initial attack was an outstanding success, but progress on 21 November was less impressive.

From the third day of the offensive, as the British ground their way into Bourlon Wood, CCXXXII AFA Bde switched to 29th Division. This formation had attacked on 20 November and was still in the line when the Germans launched a counter-offensive on 30 November. Located in the Couillet Wood valley, XVII Brigade and CCXXXII RFA Bdes assisted 86th Infantry Bde with rapid fire from four batteries, but the other battery positions were menaced by the large numbers of German infantry advancing towards Marcoing after breaking through 20th (Light) Division's positions. One of CCXXXIII's batteries was overrun, the gun detachments withdrawing at the last moment, taking the guns' breechblocks and sights with them. 29th Division was engaged in a desperate fight for Masnières and then for Marcoing. The RA historian records that the two brigades 'fired incessantly in support of the hard pressed 20th (Light) Division ... During this day alone the guns of 29th Division fired 11,500 rounds of 18-pounder and 2,500 rounds of 4.5-inch ammunition. The guns had, in many cases almost unaided, stopped the enemy advance, and where he tried to get on they cut him to pieces'.

The confused fighting continued on 1 December, with the remaining 11 guns of CCXXXIII Bde supporting 29th Division as it swung back to cover the positions on the St Quentin Canal. The divisional artillery commander withdrew the forward batteries of XVII and CCXXXII Bdes from south of Marcoing half way back to Ribécourt-la-Tour. 6th Division came up in support of 29th Division as the Germans renewed their attacks on 3 December, and the two RFA brigades continued firing to support it as the retreat to Marcoing was completed. At the end of the battle, the British had been pushed back more or less to their starting line.

==== Spring Offensive ====
In mid-December, CCXXXII AFA Bde was transferred to V Corps, with which it remained during the winter. It was rested from 23 January to 24 February 1918, then joined 61st (2nd South Midland) Division in XVIII Corps, Fifth Army. It was still with this division when the German spring offensive opened on 21 March (the Battle of St Quentin). Although the British Forward Zone was quickly overrun, 61st Division held its Battle Zone defences all day. Every time the Germans formed up for an attack, they were engaged by artillery and machine guns and the attacks were broken up, but many field guns were overrun. The following day XVIII Corps was forced to withdraw to the line of the Somme, which was defended on 24–25 March (the Actions at the Somme Crossings).

As the 'Great Retreat' continued, XVIII Corps' artillery withdrew towards the French army and found themselves supporting French formations around Montdidier. On 27 March, CCXXXII AFA Bde officially transferred to 36th (Ulster) Division, also supporting the French. The brigade was withdrawn for refit on 1 April, which continued for most of the month. It returned to V Corps in Third Army on 25 April, and spent the early summer with various divisions or in Corps Reserve until the end of July when it briefly joined VI Corps before going into GHQ Reserve.

==== Hundred Days Offensive ====
On 6 August, the brigade rejoined 12th (Eastern) Division for the Battle of Amiens (8 August), the keynote of which was thorough preparation and execution of the artillery fireplan, and then rapid movement of the field batteries behind the advancing infantry, though 12t Division did not have things all its own way. After another period of rest, CCXXXII AFA Bde joined 40th Division, which was being reconstituted after the disasters of March. After a spell in Corps Reserve, the brigade joined 62nd (2nd West Riding) Division for the Battle of Havrincourt on 12 September. It then switched to the 4th Australian Division for the follow-up attack (the Battle of Épehy), which followed a 'splendid' barrage and made deep inroads into the German positions.

On 22 September 1918, the brigade transferred to IX Corps, which had been reconstituted in Fourth Army to take a leading role in the continuing Hundred Days Offensive. IX Corps assigned it to its former parent formation, 46th (North Midland) Division, for the Battle of St Quentin Canal (29 September–2 October) when the division performed one of the great feats of the First World War by crossing the canal and breaking open the Hindenburg Line. Careful artillery preparation and support was an integral part of this success. Sir Hill Child of 46th Division had nine brigades of field artillery under his command, including CCXXXII AFA Bde, and several brigades of corps heavy artillery were also firing on the division's front. The bombardment began on the night of 26/27 September with harassing fire and gas shells, followed with intense bombardment with high explosive shells until the morning of the assault. Every field gun was used in carefully timed barrages: creeping barrages (including smoke shells) ahead of the attacking troops, with pauses at the end of each phase, including a standing barrage of three hours to allow mopping-up of the first objectives to be carried out and for the second wave of troops to pass through and renew the attack behind the next creeping barrage. The first of these creeping barrages actually progressed at twice the normal pace while the infantry rushed downhill to seize the canal crossings; it was described in the Official History as 'one of the finest ever seen'. The attack was a brilliant success, and by the afternoon the field artillery batteries were crossing the canal by the bridges that had been captured or thrown across, and were coming into action on the far side.

After a brief rest, the brigade rejoined 46th (NM) Division during the follow-up attacks against the Beaurevoir Line on 4 October, when Beaurevoir itself was bombarded by the guns of 13 divisions and 15 AFAs, as well as heavy guns. The brigade then switched to 6th Division for the Battle of Cambrai (1918) on 8 October. The 6th was troubled by a French formation on the flank not coming up, and a creeping barrage not being fired for a second attack, but still took nearly all the objectives, including 'Mannequin Wood'.

It was CCXXXII AFA Brigade's last action; from 10 October until the Armistice with Germany, it was in GHQ Reserve with Third Army. In 1919, it was placed in suspended animation.

=== 2/III North Midland Brigade ===
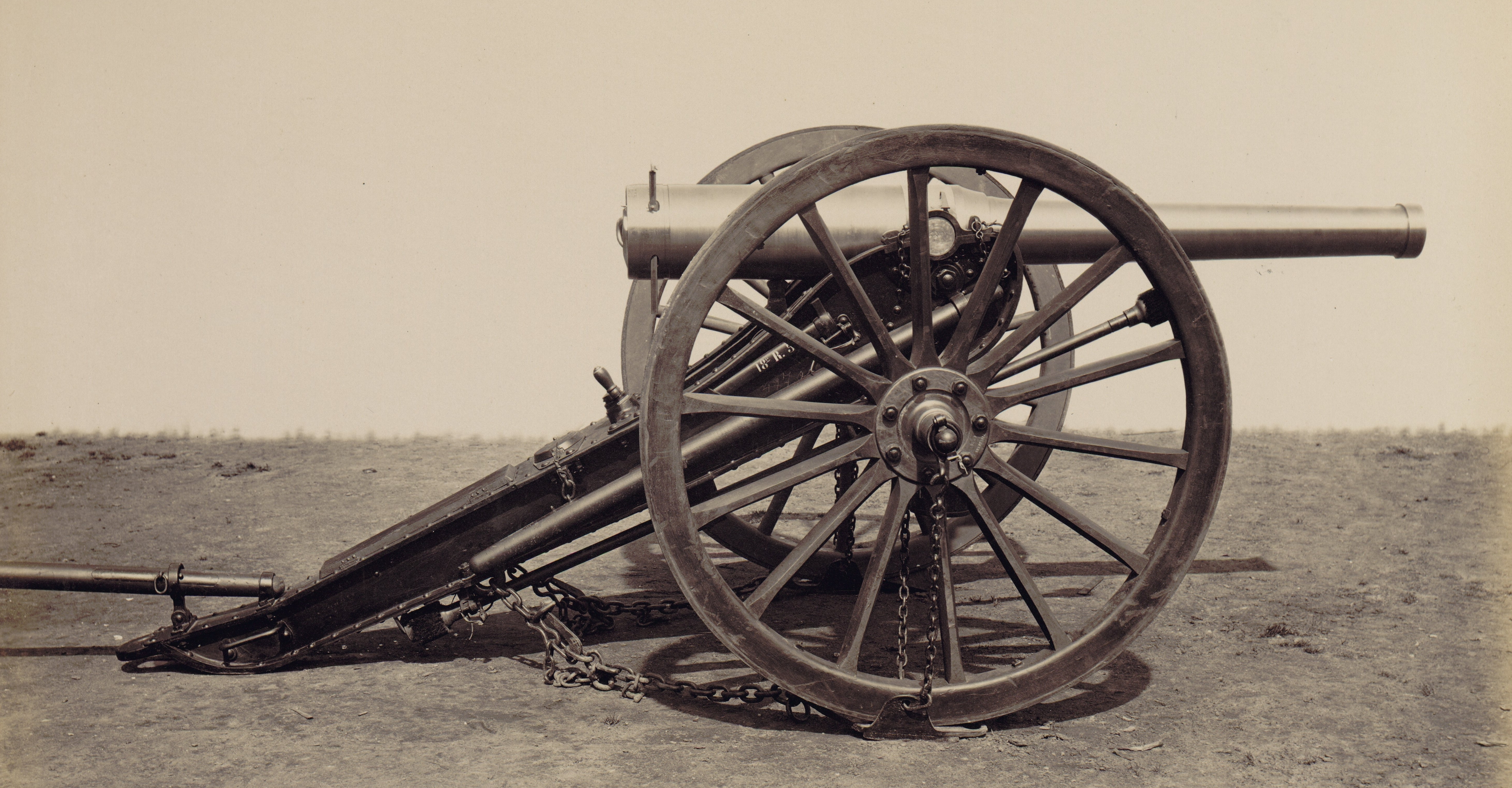
De Bange 90 mm cannon issued to 2nd Line TF units

Meanwhile, the men who had not volunteered for foreign service, together with the recruits who were coming forward, remained to form the 2/I North Midland Brigade, RFA, in the 2nd North Midland Division (59th (2nd North Midland) Division from August 1915), which concentrated round Luton in January 1915. At first the 2nd Line recruits had to parade in civilian clothes and train with 'Quaker' guns – logs of wood mounted on cart wheels – but these shortages were slowly made up. Uniforms arrived in November 1914, but it was not until March 1915 that a few 90 mm French guns arrived for training. The division took over the requisitioned transport and second-hand horse harness when 46th Division was re-equipped and left for France. The divisional artillery were joined at Luton by the 1st Line 4th Home Counties (Howitzer) Brigade, RFA, and Wessex Heavy Bty, RGA, which were fully equipped and could lend guns for training. Later, the 59th Divisional Artillery took over some 15-pounders (without sights) from a TF division that was proceeding to India. In July, the division moved out of overcrowded Luton, the artillery moving to Hemel Hempstead, where they spent the winter of 1915–16. In early 1916 the batteries were finally brought up to establishment in horses, and 18-pounders replaced the 15-pounders.

==== Ireland ====
In April 1916, the 59th Division was the mobile division of Central Force in England, and it was ordered to Ireland when the Easter Rising occurred, the divisional artillery landing at Kingstown on 28 April. The artillery moved up to Ballsbridge to support the infantry but was not engaged, and once the trouble in Dublin had been suppressed, the troops moved out to The Curragh to continue training. As was the case with the RFA units in the BEF, the brigade went through major reorganisation at this time. On 29 April 1916, the batteries were designated A, B and C, and later the brigade was numbered CCXCVII (297) Brigade, RFA. At the end of May, the brigade was joined by 2/1st Glamorganshire Royal Horse Artillery (equipped with four 18-pounder field guns rather than horse artillery guns) which became D/CCXCVII. However, on 10 July, C (Glamorgan RHA) Bty was exchanged with C (Howitzer) Bty from CCXCVIII (2/IV NM) Bde (originally from LIX Bde, a Kitchener's Army unit with 11th (Northern) Division). This became D (H) Bty, equipped with 4.5-inch howitzers. On 31 July, the Brigade Ammunition Column was absorbed into 59th Divisional Ammunition Column.

==== Disbandment ====
In January 1917, the 59th Division was relieved in Ireland and returned to the UK, concentrating at the Fovant training area on the edge of Salisbury Plain preparatory to embarking for France. However, before leaving England, CCXCVII Bde was broken up: a 2-gun section from each of A, B and C Btys was transferred to A, B and C Btys of CCXCV (2/I NM) Bde to bring them up to six guns each, and similarly the other sections joined A, B and C of CCXCVI (2/II NM) Bde; D (H) Bty became D (H) Bty in CCXCVIII Bde.

== Interwar ==
When the TF was reformed in 1920 (and renamed as the Territorial Army (TA)), RFA brigades standardised on an establishment of three field and one howitzer battery: the 3rd and 4th North Midland Bdes were combined into a single unit consisting of two Derbyshire batteries from the 4th and two Staffordshire batteries from the 3rd. Although the unit was briefly referred to as the 3rd North Midland Bde, its HQ was at Siddal's Road, Derby, and continued the lineage of the old 4th; it remained part of 46th (North Midland) Division. In 1921, it was redesignated as 62nd (North Midland) Brigade, RFA with the following organisation:

- 245 (Derby) Bty
- 246 (Derby) Bty (Howitzers)
- 247 (Wolverhampton) Bty
- 248 (West Bromwich) Bty

The unit title became 'Field Brigade, RA', in 1924 when the RFA was subsumed into the Royal Artillery. In 1938, the RA adopted the designation 'regiment' instead of 'brigade' for a lieutenant-colonel's command.

In the 1920 reorganisation, 6th Staffordshire Bty at Stafford was briefly redesignated 4th Staffordshire in 2nd North Midland Bde, then from 1921 as 244 (Stafford) Bty in 61st (North Midlaned) Field Bde. Just before the outbreak of World War II, it was transferred to 61st's duplicate, 116th (North Midland) Field Regiment.

== Anti-aircraft conversion ==
During the 1930s, the increasing need for anti-aircraft (AA) defence for Britain's cities was addressed by converting a number of TA units and formations to the AA role. 46th (North Midland) Division became 2nd AA Division in 1936 and many of its infantry battalions were subsequently converted to AA gun or searchlight roles. By the end of 1937, 62nd Field Brigade was also being converted. During 1938, Regimental HQ (RHQ) and the two Derby batteries reorganised as 68th (North Midland) AA Regiment, while the two Staffordshire batteries from the old 3rd North Midland left to form the basis of a new 73rd AA Regiment at Wolverhampton.

== Memorials ==
There are two memorials to the 46th (North Midland) Division on the battlefield of the Hohenzollern Redoubt: one on the road between Vermelles and Hulluch, marking the jumping-off point of the attack, and one on the site of the redoubt itself, which lists all the units of the division.

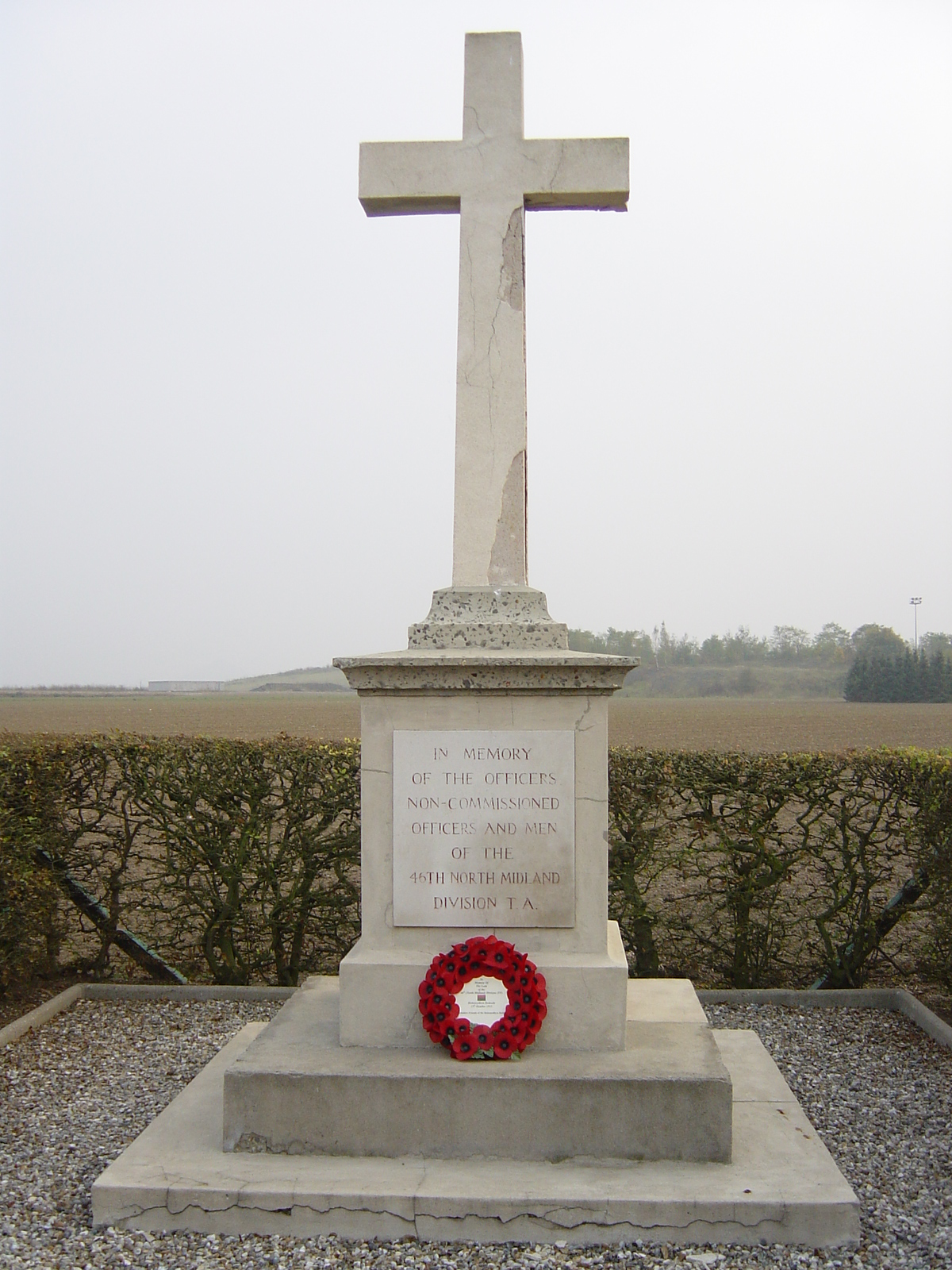
The 46th (North Midland) Division memorial on the road between Vermelles and Hulluch

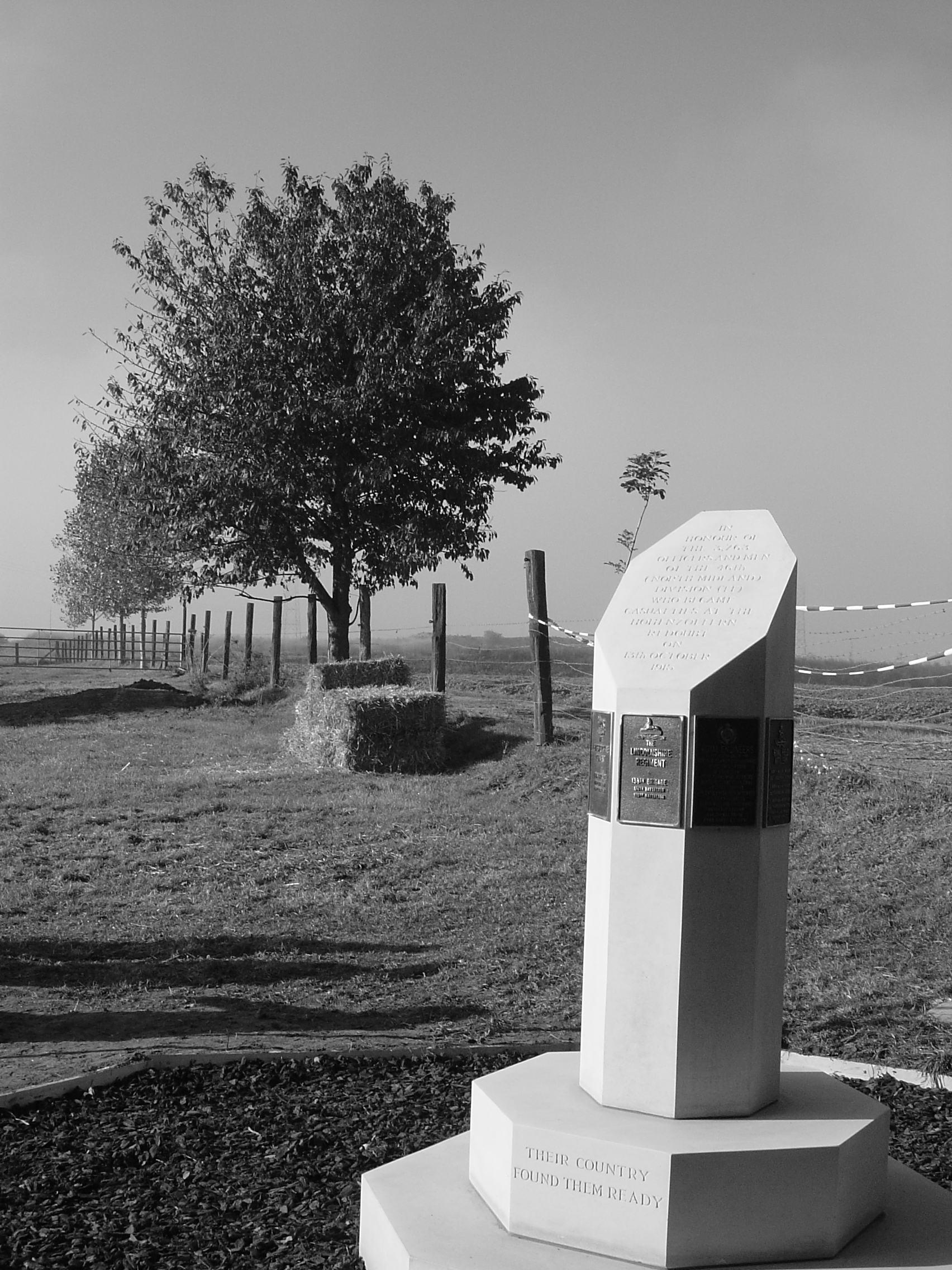
The memorial honouring the casualties of the 46th Division at the Hohenzollern Redoubt
