= Frederick Gordon (British Army officer) =

British Army general (1861–1927)

Major-General The Honourable Sir Frederick Gordon KCB DSO
- Colonel Gordon c. 1914
- Born: 9 October 1861
- Died: 18 October 1927 (aged 66)
- Military career
- Allegiance: United Kingdom
- Branch: British Army; Royal Air Force
- Service years: 1881–1920
- Rank: Major-General
- Commands: North-Eastern Area (1918); No. 4 Area RAF (1918); 22nd Division (1915–1917); 19th Brigade; 1st Battalion, Gordon Highlanders (1908–1911)
- Conflicts: Anglo-Egyptian War; Second Boer War; First World War
- Awards: Knight Commander of the Order of the Bath; Distinguished Service Order; Mentioned in Despatches (9); Order of the White Eagle, 2nd Class (Serbia)

Major-General Sir Frederick Gordon, KCB, DSO (9 October 1861 – 18 October 1927) was a British general who served as a senior British Army officer and then additionally served in the early Royal Air Force.

== Early life and education ==
Gordon was born on 9 October 1861 to Edward Gordon, Baron Gordon of Drumearn, a law lord and Conservative politician. He attended Highgate School and Wellington College, Berkshire, and then, as a gentleman cadet, he attended the Royal Military College, Sandhurst, to undergo officer training.

== Military career ==
=== Early service ===
On 22 January 1881, Gordon was commissioned as a subaltern, with the rank of second lieutenant, into the British Army. That year, he served as an officer in the 91st (Argyllshire Highlanders) Regiment of Foot, the Princess Charlotte of Wales's (Royal Berkshire Regiment), the Royal Berkshire Regiment, and the Gordon Highlanders. This was the year of the Childers Reforms, which caused turmoil in some areas of the British Army with its disbandment and amalgamation of some infantry regiments. During his early career he served abroad with the Gordon Highlanders: he saw service in Egypt (1882–1885), fighting at the Battle of Tell El Kebir, Second Battle of El Teb and Battle of Tamai; in Sudan (1889) at the Battle of Toski; and, after being made a captain in November 1890, in South Africa (1899–1902) during the Second Boer War.

He attended the Staff College, Camberley, from 1892 to 1893, where Henry Wilson, Henry Rawlinson, Aylmer Haldane, Alexander Hamilton-Gordon, Thomas Snow and Hubert Hamilton were among his fellow classmates.

For his service in the Second Boer War, at the beginning of which in October 1899 he was promoted to major, he received the brevet rank of lieutenant colonel on 22 August 1902.

In February 1903 he was appointed a deputy assistant quartermaster general (DAQMG) with the 1st Division, stationed with the 1st Army Corps at Aldershot. On 9 January 1908, Gordon was promoted to the substantive rank of lieutenant colonel. From 1908 to 1911, during which time he received the brevet rank of colonel in April 1908, he was commanding officer of the 1st Battalion, Gordon Highlanders. On 10 August 1911, he succeeded Colonel Beauvoir De Lisle as general staff officer, 1st grade (GSO1) of the 2nd Division. He was promoted to colonel on 30 August 1911.

=== First World War ===
Officers of the Gordon Highlanders, presumably during the First World War. Gordon, then a colonel, is say fifth from the left.

Gordon served during the First World War, which began in the summer of 1914, initially in his role as the 2nd Division's GSO1, accompanying it to the Western Front as part of the British Expeditionary Force (BEF) in the opening weeks of the war.

In September, however, after receiving a promotion to the temporary rank of brigadier general, he became the second commander of the 19th Infantry Brigade after Major General Laurence Drummond, which he led in all of its engagements over the next few months.

He became general officer commanding (GOC) of the 22nd Division, one of the newly raised formations of Kitchener's Army, in June 1915, "for distinguished service in the Field", shortly after being promoted to temporary major general, which was soon after made a substantive promotion.

After initial service in France, the division was ordered to the Macedonian front in late 1915. Under Gordon's command, they arrived in Salonika between late October and early November. He led the division through its most intense period of fighting on this front, including the Battle of Doiran in April–May 1917.

On 1 April 1918, he was granted a temporary commission in the newly created Royal Air Force (RAF) as a major general. He was the appointed General Officer Commanding (GOC) No 4 Area. No 4 Area was renamed, and he then served as GOC North-Eastern Area from May 1918 to January 1919.

He was mentioned in dispatches five times for his service in the war.

Gordon retired from the army in March 1920.

== Personal life ==
In 1897 Gordon married Mabel Rose Robinson. Together they had three children; one son and two daughters.

He died on 18 October 1927, aged 66.

== Honours ==
Gordon was awarded the Egypt Medal with three clasps and the Khedive's Star for his service in Egypt and Sudan in the 1880s. He was awarded the Queen's South Africa Medal with six clasps, the King's South Africa Medal with both clasps, and was mentioned in despatches four times for his service during the Second Boer War. On 29 November 1900, he was appointed a Companion of the Distinguished Service Order (DSO) "in recognition of the services [...] in connection with the Campaign in South Africa, 1899–1900".

Gordon received a number of honours for his service during the First World War. On 15 February 1915, he was appointed a Companion of the Order of the Bath (CB) "in recognition of the meritorious services [...] during the war". In the 1917 King's Birthday Honours, he was promoted to Knight Commander of the Order of the Bath (KCB) "for valuable services rendered in connection with Military Operations in the Field", and thereby granted the title Sir. He was also mentioned in despatches five times during the war.

He also received a foreign awards from Allied nations. In February 1916, he was awarded the Order of the White Eagle, 2nd Class (with Swords) by the King of Serbia. In September 1919, it was announced that he had been appointed Grand Officer of the Order of the Crown of Romania by the King of Romania "for distinguished services rendered during the course of the campaign".

== Bibliography ==
- Hesilrige, Arthur G. M. (1921). Debrett's Peerage and Titles of courtesy. London, UK: Dean & Son. p. 408.

Military offices
| New command | GOC 22nd Division; 1915–1917 | Succeeded by John Duncan |
