= William Bellairs =

British army officer (1828–1913)

Major-General Sir William Bellairs KCMG CB
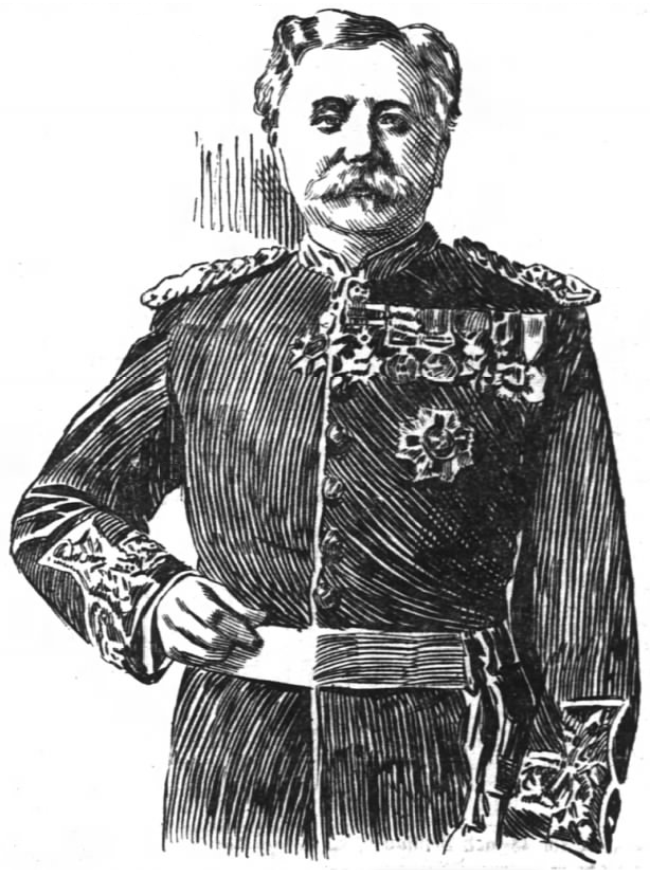
- Born: 28 August 1828
- Died: 24 July 1913 (aged 84); Clevedon, Somerset
- Military career
- Allegiance: United Kingdom
- Branch: British Army
- Rank: Major-General
- Conflicts: Crimean War; Xhosa Wars; First Boer War
- Awards: Knight Commander of the Order of St Michael and St George; Knight Commander of the Order of the Bath

Major-General Sir William Bellairs KCMG CB (28 August 1828 – 24 July 1913) was a British Army officer.

== Military career ==
Bellairs was born on 28 August 1828, the youngest son of Sir William Bellairs, of Mulbarton, Norfolk, who had served with the 15th Hussars, in the Peninsula and at Waterloo. He entered the 49th Regiment as ensign on 8 May 1846, becoming captain in 1854. He served throughout the Crimean War, being one of the comparatively few combat officers who remained at the front for the duration of the war, and took part in the battles of Alma and Inkerman, and the siege and fall of Sebastopol. He was present at the repulse of the Russian sortie of 26 October 1854, the attack on the Quarries on 7 June 1855, and the two attacks on the Redan on 18 June and 28 September. He particularly distinguished himself at the Battle of Inkerman, and displayed a readiness of resource and clearness of perception in emergencies which would have done credit to a man of greater experience of war; especially on one occasion, when, after going into action in command of a wing of his regiment, he charged with the bayonet and utterly routed a strong Russian battalion advancing upon guns in position close to his small command of 183 men. His name was submitted for a brevet-majority but passed over on the ground that he had been promoted to captain only a few weeks before. From December 1854, until the close of the campaign he served on the staff of the 2nd Division, and, his distinguished conduct having brought to notice in despatches, he was promoted brevet-major, received the Crimean medal with three clasps, was appointed a Knight of the Legion of Honour, and was awarded the 5th Class of Medjidieh, together with the Turkish medal.

He subsequently served at intervals in various staff appointments in the West Indies, in Ireland, in Canada, and at Gibraltar, in the course of which he was promoted Lieutenant-Colonel in December, 1865, and Colonel in August, 1873. In May, 1877, he proceeded to the Cape of Good Hope as D.A. and Q.M.G., and in that capacity served throughout the Xhosa War of 1877–78, commanding the combined forces on the eastern frontier of the Cape Colony from December, 1877, to March, 1878. Having been repeatedly mentioned in despatches, he was nominated a C.B. as the reward of his services.

When in the following year, it was considered necessary to break the power of the Zulus, Colonel Bellairs was attached to the staffs first of Lord Chelmsford and then of Lord Wolseley, and commanded the laager for the protection of the column train during the engagement at Ulundi. He was repeatedly mentioned in despatches, was especially brought to the notice of the Secretary of State by Sir Bartle Frere, and was created a Knight Commander of the Order of St Michael and St George (KCMG), also receiving a medal with clasp and being selected for a reward for distinguished service.

He served as military commander and civil administrator in the Colony of Natal.

He was promoted major-general in September 1884, and retired from the active list with the honorary rank of lieutenant-general in December 1887. He was appointed Colonel of the Sherwood Foresters (Derbyshire Regiment) on 19 July 1902, and transferred to his old regiment, now the Royal Berkshire Regiment, on 9 June 1905.

== Family ==
Bellairs died 24 July 1913 at Clevedon, Somerset and was survived by his wife, Blanche St. John Bellairs (née Moschzisker) whom he married in 1867. He had previously been married to Emily Craven Gibbons (d. 1866). He was the father of five sons and two daughters, including Carlyon Bellairs

Sir William is buried in St Mary Magdalen church Mulbarton, Norfolk.

Military offices
Preceded by Sir Mark Walker	Colonel of the Sherwood Foresters; 1902–1905	Succeeded by Sir Horace Smith-Dorrien
Preceded by Robert William Lowry	Colonel of the Royal Berkshire Regiment; 1905–1913	Succeeded by Edward Thompson Dickson
