= 79th Brigade (United Kingdom) =

Military unit

- Active: 13 September 1914–10 May 1919
- Allegiance: United Kingdom
- Branch: New Army
- Type: Infantry
- Size: Brigade
- Part of: 26th Division
- Engagements: Second Battle of Doiran; Pursuit to the Strumica Valley

The 79th Brigade (79th Bde) was an infantry formation of the British Army during World War I. It was raised as part of 'Kitchener's Army' and was assigned to the 26th Division. It served on the Salonika Front, fighting in the disastrous Second Battle of Doiran in 1917. At the end of the war it spearheaded the pursuit of the defeated enemy and took part in the postwar occupation of Bulgaria before it was disbanded in 1919.

== Recruitment and training ==
Alfred Leete's recruitment poster for Kitchener's Army.

On 6 August 1914, less than 48 hours after Britain's declaration of war, Parliament sanctioned an increase of 500,000 men for the Regular British Army. The newly-appointed Secretary of State for War, Earl Kitchener of Khartoum, issued his famous call to arms: 'Your King and Country Need You', urging the first 100,000 volunteers to come forward. This group of six divisions with supporting arms became known as Kitchener's First New Army, or 'K1'. The K2 and K3 battalions, brigades and divisions quickly followed: 26th Division, containing 77th and 78th and 79th Brigades, was authorised on 13 September as part of K3. Brigadier-General J. Fisher was appointed to command 79th Bde on 17 September. The brigade assembled around Codford St Mary and Stockton Camp on the edge of Salisbury Plain.

As the junior division of K3, there were no khaki uniforms available for the men, who were clothed in any makeshift uniforms the clothing contractors could find. Later it became possible to issue a form of blue uniform. It took longer to obtain drill-pattern rifles and accoutrements, but barrack-square training continued until the weather worsened at the end of October, turning the drill ground and tent floors into a sea of mud. In November the division was dispersed into billets near their recruiting areas, with the Devons and Duke of Cornwall's going to Bath, Somerset, the Hampshires to Basingstoke and then Bath, and the Wiltshires to Marlborough, Wiltshire. The men now had drill rifles for training, and khaki uniforms and equipment arrived between February and April 1915. In April and May the units returned to Salisbury Plain and were concentrated in huts between Sutton Veny and Longbridge Deverill near Warminster. Brigade training could now begin, and the drill rifles were slowly replaced by Short Magazine Lee–Enfield Mk III service rifles. Divisional training started in July, followed by final battle training. The division completed its mobilisation on 10 September and was ordered to France to join the British Expeditionary Force on the Western Front. The first advanced parties for Boulogne left on 12 September, and by 23 September the division had completed its concentration around Guignemicourt, west of Amiens.

=== Order of Battle ===
The composition of 79th Brigade was as follows:

- 10th (Service) Battalion, Devonshire Regiment
- 8th (Service) Battalion, Duke of Cornwall's Light Infantry (DCLI)
- 12th (Service) Battalion, Hampshire Regiment
- 7th (Service) Battalion, Wiltshire Regiment – to Western Front 16 June 1918
- 79th Machine Gun (MG) Company, Machine Gun Corps – formed at Grantham, embarked at Devonport 5 July 1916; disembarked at Salonika 14 July and joined brigade 15 July
- 79th Trench Mortar Battery (TMB) – manned by detachments from the infantry; joined 3 November 1916
- 79th Small Arms Ammunition (SAA) Section – manned by the Royal Field Artillery; numbered 23 March 1916; detached from Divisional Ammunition Column (DAC) and joined brigade by 27 July 1916

== Service ==
From 28 September 1915 the brigades and battalions of 26th Division were attached to units already in the line for their introduction to Trench warfare. Then on 31 October the division was ordered to Marseille to embark for another theatre. Entrainment began at Flesselles on 9 November and embarkation two days later, with the division expecting to be sent to Egypt. However, the destination was changed to the Macedonian front, and ships carrying elements of the division began to arrive at Salonika on 23 November. On 26 December the first units moved out of the Salonika base area to Happy Valley Camp, where the division completed its concentration on 8 February 1916.

When the Allies moved out of their entrenched camp in April 26th Division. remained behind as Army Reserve and for road construction. Because of the movement difficulties in the mountainous terrain, the British Salonika Army (BSA) reorganised its transport to rely on pack mules. One result of this was that by July the reorganised brigade SAA sections were detached from the DAC and attached to the brigades they served. In August 26th Division moved up to the Lake Doiran sector of the front. 79th Brigade was not directly engaged when 78th Bde captured Horseshoe Hill (part of the First Battle of Doiran) on 17 August. Afterwards the British west of Lake Doiran conducted a holding operation for the rest of the year, with numerous raids to pin down the Bulgarians. On the night of 10 October the 12th Hampshires attacked Goldies Hill, a Bulgarian outpost, and captured a prisoner at a cost of one casualty. On the night of 23 December 7th Wiltshires raided the enemy lines on the Petit Couronné, killing three Bulgarians; unfortunately they had no identification marks on them, and the raiders suffered eight wounded. A much bigger operation against the Petit Couronné was carried out by 10th Devonshires on 10 February. This was against the Bulgarians' main line at its strongest point, the lower slopes being very steep and the upper covered by broad belts of barbed wire. The attack was preceded by two days of artillery fire against the wire. In the evening the whole battalion under its commanding officer (CO), Lieutenant-Colonel T.N.S.M. Howard, crossed the Jumeaux Ravine in two columns. At 21.16 a message was received from Howard calling for a 10-minute bombardment to begin at 21.30. Meanwhile, the sappers accompanying the Devonshires completed the cutting of the wire with a Bangalore torpedo. The assault then gained a lodgement in the enemy trenches. The second objective was a concrete trench mortar emplacement about 300 yards (270 m) further on. One company fought its way with bomb and bayonet almost up to this emplacement, but was the counter-attacked and forced back. Other counter-attacks on the captured trench were driven off by a Lewis gun, the enemy being lit up by one of their own searchlights. Eventually, Howard decided that the enemy numbers were too great to complete the mission, so he gave the order to withdraw. The casualties had been heavy, 158 or about a quarter of the attacking force, though 27 Bulgarians prisoners were brought back. The stretcher-bearers had been trained to carry casualties strapped on their backs, and most of the wounded were successfully evacuated.

=== Second Battle of Doiran ===
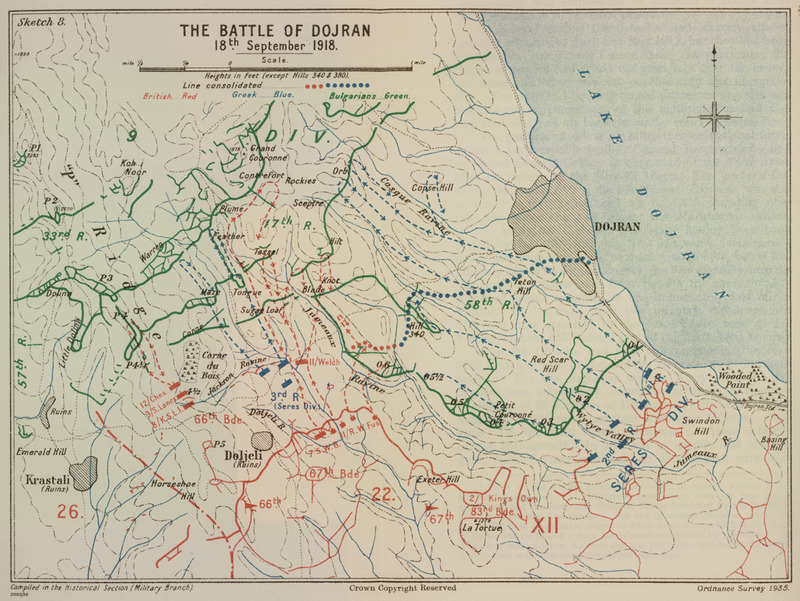
The Third Battle of Doiran, 18 September 1918: the two previous battles had been fought over the same ground.

In March and April 1917 the BSA was repositioned in preparation for an offensive in the Doiran sector. 26th Division was now one of the more experienced in the theatre, and was given a wide front of about 8,000 yards (7,300 m) (although part of it was covered by the lake). It advanced without opposition on the night of 9/10 March to take over the mounds known as the Whale Back and Bowls Barrow. The main attack (the Second Battle of Doiran) was carried out at dusk on 24 April after three days of artillery fire to cut the Bulgarian wire. 26th Division attacked with 78th and 79th Bdes in line. 79th Brigade on the right had three battalions in line and one in reserve, attacking Bulgarian positions designated O1 to O5. The brigade was hit by heavy enemy artillery on its start line before the attack began at dusk (21.45). On the lake shore the right hand company of 7th Wiltshires climbed out of Patty Ravine against O1 and found the gaps in the wire covered by enemy machine guns and temporary obstacles. Only a few entered the enemy trenches and were not seen again. The centre company fought its way across the enemy parapet and drove them out of the front trench, but owing to lack of support on either flank were driven out again. The left company found the wire in. front of O2 largely uncut and were driven back by the enemy fire and 'showers' of grenades. The 10th Devonshires attacking O4 and O5 on the Petit Couronné were cut in two by the enemy barrage falling between the first and second waves. The two leading companies under Lt-Col Howard pushed on up the Jumeaux Ravine and captured O4, but the two rear companies suffered heavy casualties from the artillery fire and only a few got through it, so O5 was never attacked. In the centre 12th Hampshires was supposed to attack O3, but followed the Devons up the Jumeaux Ravine and was hit by the artillery barrage and held up in the narrowest part of the ravine. Only part of the right company entered the enemy trench. The Hampshire's CO, Lt-Col F.O.Koebel, collected the remnants of the left company and tried to reinforce the right, but the whole battalion was driven back and Koebel wounded. Brigadier-Gen Poole had sent up his reserve, the 8th DCLI, and by 20.40 its two leading companies were overlooking the Jumeaux Ravine, but it was another hour before any news got through from Howard on the Petit Couronné. He reported that he had two companies on O4, but no sign of his other companies. Two companies of the DCLI were sent up to reinforce him, but they ran into enemy troops and after three attempts to break though they fell back, believing that the Devons had withdrawn. The rest of the DCLI under Lt-Col F.C. Nisbet had been ordered to go down the 'sunken road' along the Jumeaux Ravine to help 12th Hampshires, but the path was blocked by a British artillery battery firing across it. Nisbet found two platoons of the divisional pioneers (8th Oxfordshire and Buckinghamshire Light Infantry) going up with bombs and ammunition, and some of the Hampshires. He then prepared to attack O3 but was ordered to wait until the divisional reserve (12th Argyll and Sutherland Highlanders) arrived to attack O2. The attack was put off from 03.30 to 04.10, but it then emerged that the Wiltshires were not in O1 and that 78th Bde to the left had already retired. The attack was called off and the troops withdrawn. The two companies of 10th Devonshires on the Petit Couronné were recalled just as carrying parties finally reached them with bombs and ammunition. The whole attack of 26th Division had been a complete and costly failure. After daylight unarmed parties of the two brigades went into Jumeaux Ravine to collect wounded. Although there was some firing against them, they were generally allowed to bring in most of the wounded.

79th Brigade too weak to take part when the attack was resumed on the night of 8/9 May, and was sent to hold the line on the other side of Lake Doiran. The renewed attack was no more successful. The BSA settled down once more to trench warfare and raiding. One of the rare Bulgarian raids on the British front was carried out early on 4 September against 79th Bde holding the Dova Tepe spur. Between 200 and 300 Bulgarians cut 70 yards (64 m) of wire and got into 8th DCLI's trenches at two points but were promptly driven out again. The DCLI lost 10 killed and 11 wounded, but the Bulgarians were unable to secure a prisoner, instead leaving three of their own men in British hands as well as other casualties.

The crisis on the Western Front after the German spring offensive in early 1918 led to urgent calls for reinforcements to be sent from other theatres. In June the BSA was required to send 12 infantry battalions, one from each of its brigades: 7th Wiltshires was sent from 79th Bde. As well as this loss of manpower, the BSA was crippled by malaria, which left many of the troops in hospital during the summer months. In September an outbreak of Spanish flu left many units unfit for action.

Preparations began in August 1918 for a new offensive in the autumn. The Third Battle of Doiran began on 18 September with attacks by British and Greek troops on either side of Lake Doiran. 22nd Division was given the main responsibility for the attack on the west side, but at Zero hour 79th Bde carried out a diversionary attack on its left. A company of 8th DCLI captured Flatiron Hill, taking a few prisoners, and a company of 12th Hampshires established itself on White Scar Hill. However, after 22nd Division's attack failed, the Bulgarians switched the full weight of their artillery onto these two positions and they were abandoned. 79th Brigade's casualties in this diversion were 112.

=== Pursuit ===
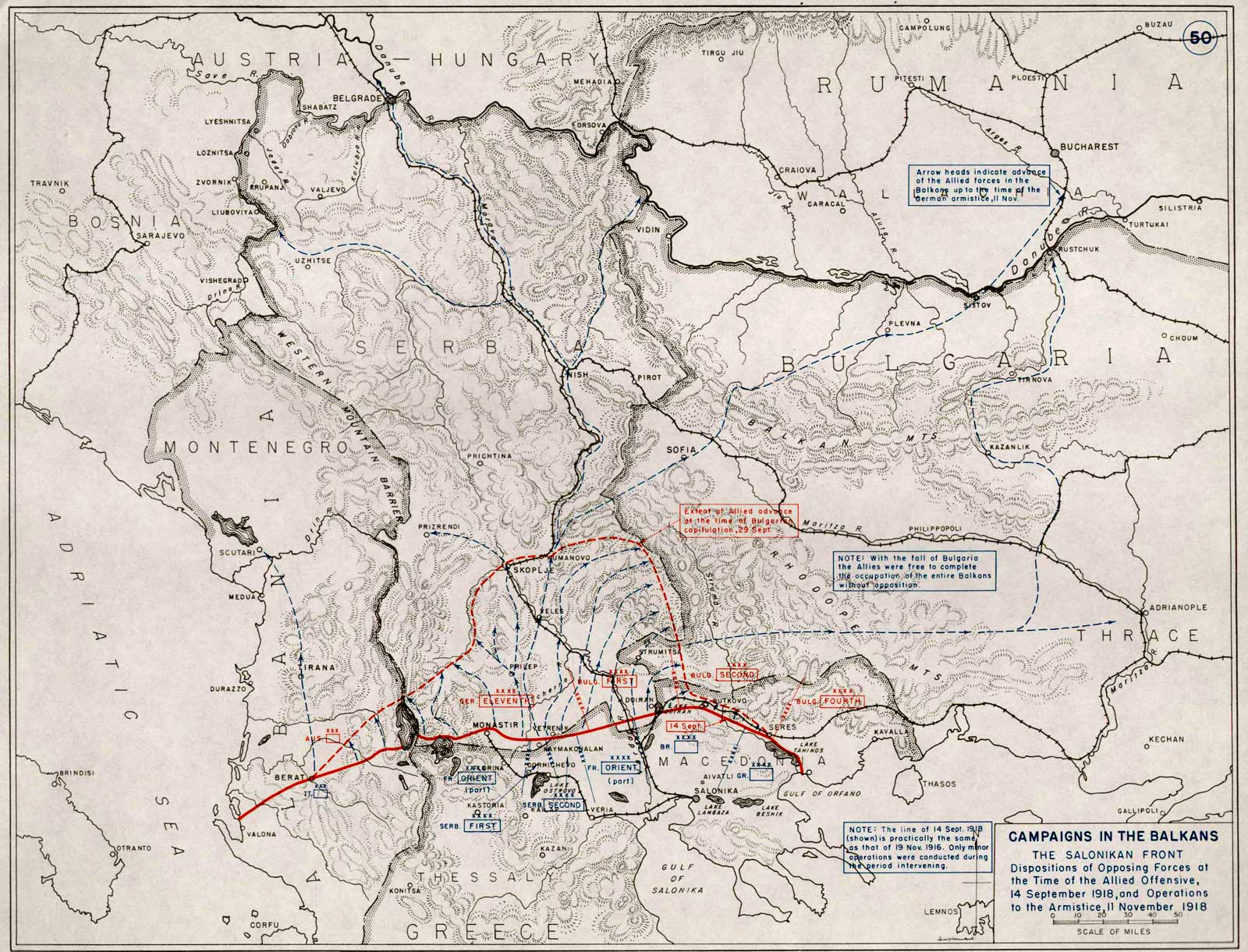
The final weeks on the Macedonian Front, including the advance to Adrianople.

In spite of the disaster at Doiran, the Allies were making good progress elsewhere along the Macedonian Front, and enemy forces were crumbling. The Bulgarians began to retreat on 21 September, and the pursuit was led in the British sector by the fittest troops, 78th and 79th Bdes of 26th Division. During the night of 21 September the division occupied the enemy's front line trenches in the Macukovo salient, and patrols sent out next morning found only weak rearguards. 26th Division was ordered to concentrate and prepare to advance up the Struma Valley. On 23 September 79th Bde followed the cavalry of the Derbyshire Yeomanry and next day they reached the River Bajima, another 10 miles (16 km) along appalling roads having left the artillery and transport far behind, with the troops eating their iron rations or captured supplies. At intervals rearguards with artillery and machine guns held up the pursuit. On 25 September the division's leading troops moved through Valandovo and crossed the Serbia–Bulgaria border. Although 79th Bde was shelled as it debouched from the Kosturino defile next day, the infantry followed the Yeomanry through Strumica and secured the bridge over the River Strumica next day. 79th Brigade reached Hamzali on 26 September before it was ordered to stand fast. On 24 September the Bulgarians had requested a ceasefire, and the Armistice of Salonica was being negotiated. On 2 September the advanced guard of 79th Bde, the 8th DCLI with D Battery of CXVI Brigade, Royal Field Artillery, moved 4 miles (6.4 km) further up the pass from Hamzali on the Berovo road until it was halted by accurate mountain artillery and machine gun fire. The attacks were to have been renewed on 30 September, but the armistice was signed on 29 September and came into force on 30 September. At this point 26th Division was occupying a line from Gradosar to Hamzali, with HQ at Dragomir.

On 6 October 26th Division began a march across Bulgaria towards the River Danube to continue operations against Austria–Hungary. It reached Kocherinovo on 18 October, but was then redirected towards the Turkish frontier. The brigades entrained at Radomir for Mustafa Pasha, west of Adrianople, 79th Bde arriving on 23 October. However, the Turks were also seeking peace and a bold plan for 26th Division to seize Adrianople by Coup de main was rejected. The Ottoman Empire signed the Armistice of Mudros on 30 October. On 2 November 26th Division was ordered to resume its advance to the Danube, but next day the Austrians signed the Armistice of Villa Giusti.

With hostilities over, 26th Division remained in Bulgaria as part of the Allied occupation force. At the end of the year 78th Bde was operating as a semi-independent brigade group stationed at Silistra on the Danube. Demobilization began in February 1919 and proceeded rapidly. Italian troops began taking over 26th Division's responsibilities from April and on 19–22 April a composite brigade from the division left for service in Egypt. 26th Division and its formations ceased to exist on 10 May 1919.

79th Brigade was not reactivated during World War II.

26th Division's formation sign.

== Insignia ==
All units of 26th Division wore a simple blue tape across the base of the shoulder straps, introduced as the divisional sign in July 1916. No brigade or battalion distinctions were worn. However, when the division was first formed and no uniforms or regimental badges were available, the battalions in each brigade were temporarily distinguished by a coloured cloth patch in buff, blue, white or green.

== Commanders ==
The following officers commanded 79th Brigade during its service:

- Brigadier-General J. Fisher, 17 September 1914 to 8 September 1915
- Brig-Gen A.J. Poole, 8 September 1915 to Armistice
- Col W.L. Rocke, acting 24 November to 30 December 1916
- Lt-Col F.C. Nisbet, acting 2 July to 2 August 1917
