= John Duncan (British Army officer, born 1872) =

British Army officer (1872–1948)

Major-General Sir John Duncan KCB CMG CVO DSO
- Born: 24 February 1872
- Died: 17 September 1948 (aged 76)
- Military career
- Allegiance: United Kingdom
- Branch: British Army
- Service years: 1891–1928
- Rank: Major-General
- Commands: 1st Division; Shanghai Defence Force; 54th (East Anglian) Infantry Division; 22nd Division; 78th Infantry Brigade
- Conflicts: Second Boer War; First World War
- Awards: Knight Commander of the Order of the Bath; Companion of the Order of St Michael and St George; Commander of the Royal Victorian Order; Distinguished Service Order; Mentioned in Despatches; Order of the White Eagle (Serbia)

Major-General Sir John Duncan, KCB, CMG, CVO, DSO (24 February 1872 – 17 September 1948) was a British Army officer who commanded the Shanghai Defence Force.

== Military career ==
Duncan was educated at the Royal Military College, and joined the Royal Scots Fusiliers in 1891. He served on the North West Frontier of the British Raj from 1897 to 1898, before taking part in the Second Boer War (1899–1901). He was appointed a Companion of the Distinguished Service Order in November 1900.

On 31 January 1902 he was seconded for service on the staff, and appointed brigade major of the infantry brigade at Malta. In April 1904 he was again seconded for staff service. In July 1907 he succeeded Lieutenant Colonel Alister Dallas as a general staff officer, grade 2 (GSO2) at the War Office. He was promoted from supernumerary captain to captain in November 1908.

On 25 August 1910 he was promoted to major and in December 1910 he was made a GSO2.

Duncan served in the First World War, being promoted in July 1915 to lieutenant colonel seeing service in the Gallipoli campaign and succeeding Brigadier General Neill Malcolm as general staff officer, grade 1 (GSO1), of the 11th (Northern) Division, a Kitchener's Army formation, in September 1915. He was promoted to temporary brigadier general in May 1916 and appointed commander of the 78th Infantry Brigade, part of the 26th Division, which was serving on the Macedonian front and where Duncan would remain for the rest of the war. He became acting general officer commanding (GOC) of the 22nd Division, also serving in Macedonia with the British Salonika Army (BSA), in May 1917, before being promoted to temporary major general in June and becoming the division's permanent commander.

In September 1919, three months after he was promoted to substantive major general, it was announced that he had been appointed Grand Officer of the Order of the Crown of Romania by the King of Romania "for distinguished services rendered during the course of the campaign". He was also appointed to the Order of the White Eagle by the King of Serbia.

After the war he became major general on the general staff of the Army of the Black Sea, formerly the BSA, from April to December 1919. He was appointed military attaché in Rome in 1920, an appointment he relinquished in May 1923, and succeeded Major General Steuart Hare as GOC 54th (East Anglian) Infantry Division in July 1923 and major general commanding the Shanghai Military Force in China from 1927 to 1928. The Shanghai Defence Force was established in January 1927 amidst concerns that British lives and properties were at risk during the unrest in China at the time. In practice he had to deal with a diplomatic incident when a British military plane made a forced landing on the International Race Course in Jiangwan. His last appointment was as GOC 1st Division at Aldershot early in 1928 before relinquishing his command in May 1928 and retiring later that year.

Duncan was chief commissioner of the St John Ambulance Brigade from 1931 to 1943. He was appointed a Bailiff Grand Cross (the highest grade) of the Venerable Order of St John in 1946.

Military offices
Preceded by Frederick Gordon	GOC 22nd Division; 1917–1919	Division disbanded
Preceded by Sir Steuart Hare	GOC 54th (East Anglian) Infantry Division; 1923–1927	Succeeded by Sir Torquhil Matheson
Preceded by Cecil Romer	GOC 1st Division; March–December 1928	Succeeded by Felix Ready
