= 67th Brigade (United Kingdom) =

Military unit

The 67th Brigade was an infantry brigade of the British Army. It was raised as part of the New Army, also known as Kitchener's Army and assigned to the 22nd Division and served on the Western Front and the Macedonian Front during the First World War.

== Formation ==
The infantry battalions did not all serve at once, but all were assigned to the brigade during the war.

- 11th (Service) Battalion, Royal Welsh Fusiliers
- 7th (Service) Battalion, South Wales Borderers
- 8th (Service) Battalion, South Wales Borderers
- 11th (Service) Battalion, Welsh Regiment
- 67th Machine Gun Company
- 67th SAA Section Ammunition Column
- 67th Trench Mortar Battery
