= James Welch (VC) =

Recipient of the Victoria Cross (1889–1978)

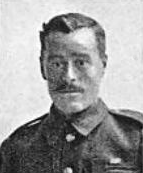
- Born: 7 July 1889; Stratfield Saye, Hampshire, England
- Died: 28 June 1978 (aged 88); Bournemouth, Dorset, England
- Military career
- Allegiance: United Kingdom
- Branch: British Army
- Rank: Sergeant
- Units: Royal Berkshire Regiment
- Conflicts: World War I
- Awards: Victoria Cross

James Welch VC (7 July 1889 – 28 June 1978) was an English recipient of the Victoria Cross, the highest and most prestigious award for gallantry in the face of the enemy that can be awarded to British and Commonwealth forces.

James Welch was born at Stratfield Saye. He was 27 years old, and a lance corporal in the 1st Battalion, Royal Berkshire Regiment (Princess Charlotte of Wales's), British Army during the First World War when he performed the actions for which he was awarded the VC.

On 29 April 1917 near Oppy, France, Lance-Corporal Welch entered an enemy trench and killed one man after a severe hand-to-hand struggle. Then, armed only with an empty revolver, he chased four enemies across the open and captured them single-handedly. He handled his machine-gun with the utmost fearlessness, and more than once went into the open, exposed to heavy fire, to search for and collect ammunition and spare parts in order to keep his guns in action, which he succeeded in doing for over five hours, until wounded by a shell.

He later achieved the rank of sergeant. He died at the age of 88 on 28 June 1978 at Bournemouth and was cremated there on 4 July. His VC is displayed at The Royal Gloucestershire, Berkshire and Wiltshire Regiment (Salisbury) Museum, Salisbury, Wiltshire, England.
