= Crossley-Kegresse half-track =

1920s British army mechanised vehicle

Crossley-Kégresse half-track
- Type: Half-track prime mover Infantry mobility vehicle
- Place of origin: United Kingdom

Service history
- Used by: United Kingdom
- Wars: Northern Expedition (Shanghai Defence Force)

Production history
- No. built: 115 (ordered)

Specifications
- Mass: 5 ton
- Main armament: none
- Engine: 4.5-litre (275 cu in) four-cylinder water-cooled petrol 65 hp (48 kW)
- Maximum speed: 35 mph (56 km/h)

The Crossley-Kégresse half-track was an experimental half-track using the Kégresse track tested by the British army in the late 1920s. The production vehicles were built by Crossley Motors in the United Kingdom and delivered to the army from 1926. The Kégresse track was licensed from Citroën in France, which employed its inventor Adolphe Kégresse.

== Development ==
Kégresse half-tracks were also extensively used by the French army, including the later Citroën P17 and P107 utility half-tracks. In 1923, the British army purchased Kégresse half-track vehicles from Citroën for testing but ultimately decided they were not satisfactory for its purposes and commissioned Crossley Motors to produce a new vehicle using the licensed track from Citroën.

In the British army, the Crossley vehicle could replace horses for haulage work that otherwise only animals could do, one of the first such attempts in the world. The Kégresse track had a two-speed gearbox while the standard gearbox had four speeds, giving a total of eight forward speeds. It was otherwise driven like a truck. It was used as a general service vehicle, a staff car and an artillery tractor.

== Service history ==
=== Trials ===
Test trials began in October 1924. In February 1925 comparative cross-country and road trials took place in which the Crossley-Kégresse half-track came first, ahead of the fully tracked Vickers Light Dragon Mark II. By November 1925, it had been found "capable of traversing the most difficult country at a very fair speed" in government trials. In later trials, it proved capable of pulling a heavy QF 4.5-inch howitzer across open country, including through a stream. In 1926, it was demonstrated to the heads of government of the British Dominions at Camberley, equipped to tow a QF 3.7-inch mountain howitzer.

=== Experimental Mechanised Force ===
It was among the first vehicles used to equip the British interwar Experimental Mechanised Force (EMF), the first mechanised combined arms brigade in the world. At the Force's formation in 1927, the Crossley half-track was used by the machine-gun battalion of the Somerset Light Infantry and the 9th Field Brigade of the Royal Artillery, allowing these previously non-mechanised infantry and artillery units to manoeuvre alongside the 3rd and 5th battalions of the Royal Tank Corps in a prototype of a modern combined arms mechanised force. Operating with the 'fast group' it maintained a daily average cross-country speed of 10 mph (16 km/h) over 30 mi (48 km). This was "the first mechanised formation to be born in the world, and was the mother of all 'armoured divisions'".

=== Shanghai ===
Between February and May 1927, tensions arose in China. The EMF's 11 and 80 batteries, armed with QF 18-pounder guns, were re-equipped with Crossley-Kégresse half-tracks and Burford-Kégresse half-tracks, replacing their fully tracked Vickers Light Dragon Mark IIs and shipped to China as part of the Shanghai Defence Force. This Force was withdrawn in January 1928. In 1928 and 1929, the remaining Vickers Light Dragon Mark IIs towing artillery in the EMF in Britain were also replaced with Burford- and Crossley-Kégresse half tracks.

== Legacy ==
In 1927, the British War Office ordered a related Crossley vehicle in which drive wheels could be fitted with chain tracks, intended to reproduce the functionality of the Crossley-Kégresse vehicle in a more flexible format. The half-track Crossley-Kégresse left British army consideration in the early 1930s, as part of a general shift away from half-tracks to fully tracked vehicles by the army.

At least two examples of the half-track have survived and been preserved, one by the Norfolk Tank Museum and another by the British army's Royal Logistics Corps Museum, both in the United Kingdom. Official Ministry of Supply photographs of the vehicle are held in the collections of the Imperial War Museum.

== Bibliography ==
- Ventham, Philip; Fletcher, David (1990). Moving the Guns: The Mechanisation of the Royal Artillery, 1854-1939. London: HMSO. ISBN 978-0-11-290477-9.
- Fletcher, David (2022). British Military Transport, 1829–1956. London: HMSO. ISBN 978-0-11-290570-7.
- Harris, J. P. (1995). Men, Ideas and Tanks: British Military Thought and Armoured Forces, 1903–39. Manchester: Manchester University Press. ISBN 978-0-7190-4814-2.
- Liddell Hart, B. H. (1959). The Tanks: The History of the Royal Tank Regiment and its Predecessors Heavy Branch Machine-Gun Corps Tank Corps & Royal Tank Corps 1914–1945 (1914–1939). Official History of the Royal Tank Regiment. Vol. I. New York: Praeger. LCCN 58-11631. OCLC 505962433.
