= Royal Berkshire Regiment =

Princess Charlotte of Wales's (Royal Berkshire Regiment) Royal Berkshire Regiment (Princess Charlotte of Wales's)
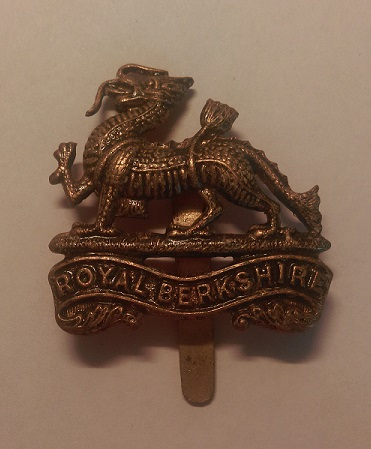
- Cap badge of the Royal Berkshire Regiment.
- Active: 1881–1959
- Country: United Kingdom
- Branch: British Army
- Type: Infantry
- Role: Line infantry
- Size: 2 Regular battalions 1 Militia battalion (Royal Berkshire Regiment); 1 – 2 Territorial and Volunteer battalions Up to 12 hostilities-only battalions
- Garrison/HQ: Brock Barracks, Reading
- Nickname: "The Biscuit Boys"
- Anniversaries: Maiwand (27 July)
- Engagements: Second Boer War; World War I World War II

The Royal Berkshire Regiment (Princess Charlotte of Wales's) was a line infantry regiment of the British Army in existence from 1881 until 1959. The regiment was created in 1881, as the Princess Charlotte of Wales's (Royal Berkshire Regiment), by the amalgamation of the 49th (Princess Charlotte of Wales's) (Hertfordshire) Regiment of Foot and the 66th (Berkshire) Regiment of Foot. In 1921, it was renamed the Royal Berkshire Regiment (Princess Charlotte of Wales's).

The regiment saw active service in the Second Boer War, World War I and World War II. On 9 June 1959, the Royal Berkshire Regiment (Princess Charlotte of Wales's) was amalgamated with the Wiltshire Regiment (Duke of Edinburgh's) to form the Duke of Edinburgh's Royal Regiment (Berkshire and Wiltshire) which was again amalgamated, on 27 July 1994, with the Gloucestershire Regiment to create the Royal Gloucestershire, Berkshire and Wiltshire Regiment. Like its predecessor regiment, however, this was on 1 February 2007 merged with the Devonshire and Dorset Regiment, the Royal Green Jackets and The Light Infantry to form a new large regiment, The Rifles.

== History ==
=== Formation and antecedents ===
The Berkshire Regiment was formed as part of the reforms carried out by Edward Cardwell and Hugh Childers, Secretaries of State for War in the late nineteenth century. The first stage, under Cardwell in 1873, introduced a "localisation scheme". This saw the United Kingdom divided into "Brigade Districts" consisting of a county or counties. Each district was assigned two regular infantry battalions, one of which would be on foreign service while the other was on home service. The home-based battalion was to provide drafts to the battalion on foreign duty as required. County militia regiments were also to be linked with the regular battalions, with all sharing a single depot in the brigade district. It was announced that a depot was to be built at Reading, Berkshire, which would serve a district comprising the County of Berkshire. The two line battalions which were to be linked were the 49th and 66th Regiments of Foot, along with the Royal Berkshire Militia. On 1 July 1881, the reforms were completed under Childers, with the formation of The Princess Charlotte of Wales's (Berkshire Regiment), consisting of the following battalions:

- 1st Battalion (formerly the 49th (Princess Charlotte of Wales's) (Hertfordshire) Regiment of Foot). The regiment had been raised in 1743, and had been granted the title "Princess Charlotte of Wales's" in 1816.
- 2nd Battalion (formerly the 66th (Berkshire) Regiment of Foot). The regiment had been raised in 1758.
- 3rd (Royal Berkshire Militia) Battalion
- 1st Volunteer Battalion (formerly the 1st Berkshire Rifle Volunteer Corps, formed in 1859).

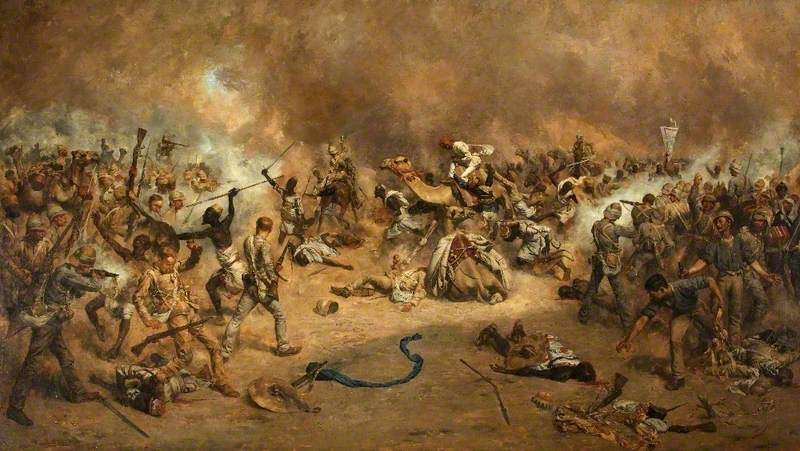
"Battle of Tofrek"

In 1885, following its service at the Battle of Tofrek, the regiment was granted "Royal" status, to become The Princess Charlotte of Wales's (Royal Berkshire Regiment).

The 1st Battalion formed part of the garrison of the Imperial fortress colony of Bermuda from 1893 through 1895. On 19 March 1896 the regiment, under Major Massard, was called in by the Penzance Borough Police and Cornwall County Constabulary to help quell disorder during the Newlyn riots. They arrived by train in Penzance at around 4pm and took temporary barracks in the town. Two hours later their assistance was requested by the Superintendent in charge and they assisted police in occupying the pier at Newlyn long enough to see in the arrival of HMS Ferret.

The 1st Battalion was posted at Gibraltar from February 1900 to November 1902, when they joined the 2nd battalion in Egypt. The 2nd Battalion was posted to South Africa in February 1898 and stayed there throughout the Second Boer War (1899–1902), leaving for Egypt in November 1902.

In 1908, the Volunteers and Militia were reorganised nationally, with the former becoming the Territorial Force and the latter the Special Reserve; the regiment now had one Reserve and one Territorial battalion.

=== The First World War ===
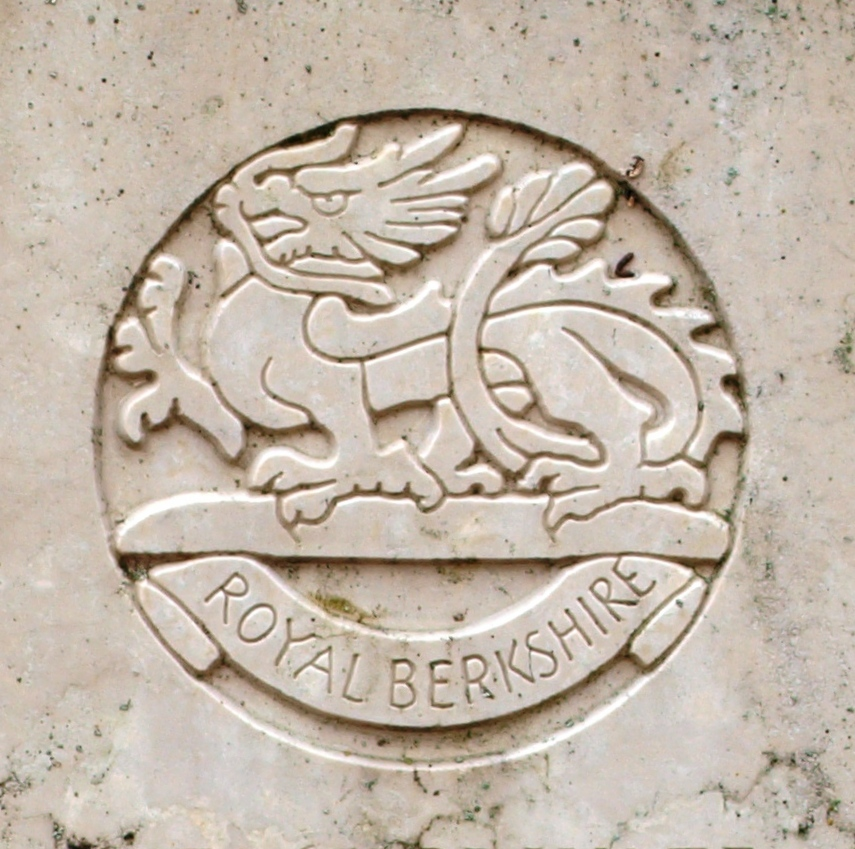
Cap badge of the Royal Berkshire Regiment as shown on a First World War grave at Vouziers military cemetery

The regiment, in common with the rest of the British Army, saw a huge expansion during the First World War and many service battalions, for war service only, were created from volunteers for Kitchener's New Armies. Most battalions would see active service in the trenches of the Western Front in Belgium and France.

==== Regular Army ====
The 1st Battalion was a Regular Army unit and was serving with the 6th Brigade, part of the 2nd Division and served with the British Expeditionary Force when it was sent to Belgium in 1914. They fought in the Battle of Mons, the Marne and the First Battle of Ypres, where the old regular British army was virtually wiped out and could have been said to have found its grave there. In 1915 during the Battle of Loos, 2nd Lieutenant Alexander Buller Turner of the 3rd Battalion, attached to the 1st, was posthumously awarded the Victoria Cross. In 1916 Lance corporal James Welch, also of the 1st Battalion, was awarded the Victoria Cross as well.

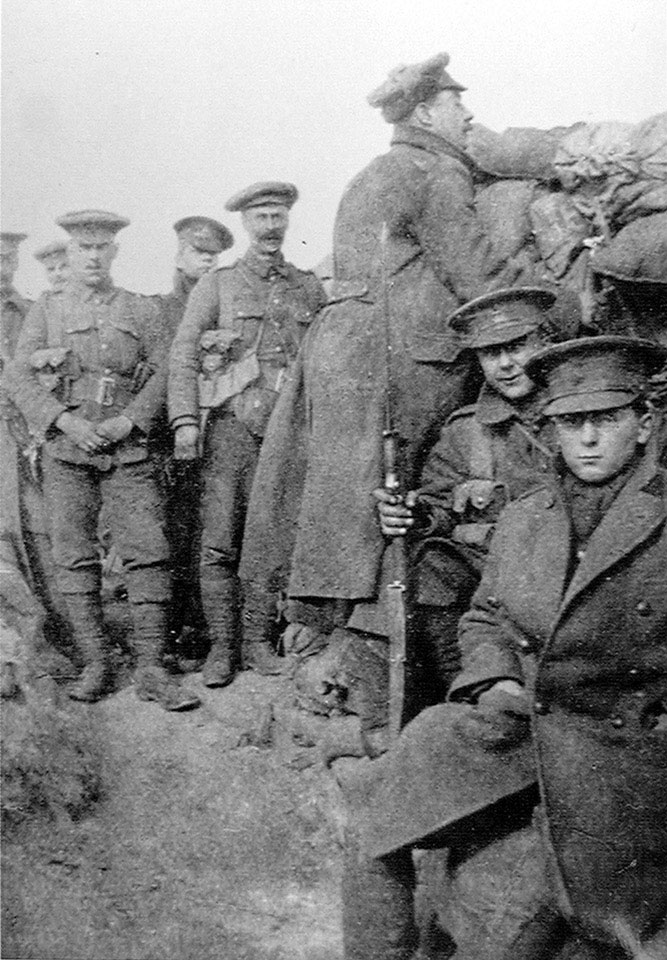
Men of the 2nd Battalion, Royal Berkshire Regiment, in the trenches, 1915.

The 2nd Battalion was also a Regular Army unit and was serving in India on the outbreak of war and was recalled to Britain, where, with other Regular units also stationed abroad, it helped form the 25th Brigade and was attached to the 8th Division. They came to the Western Front in late 1914 and served there for the rest of the war.

==== Territorial Force ====
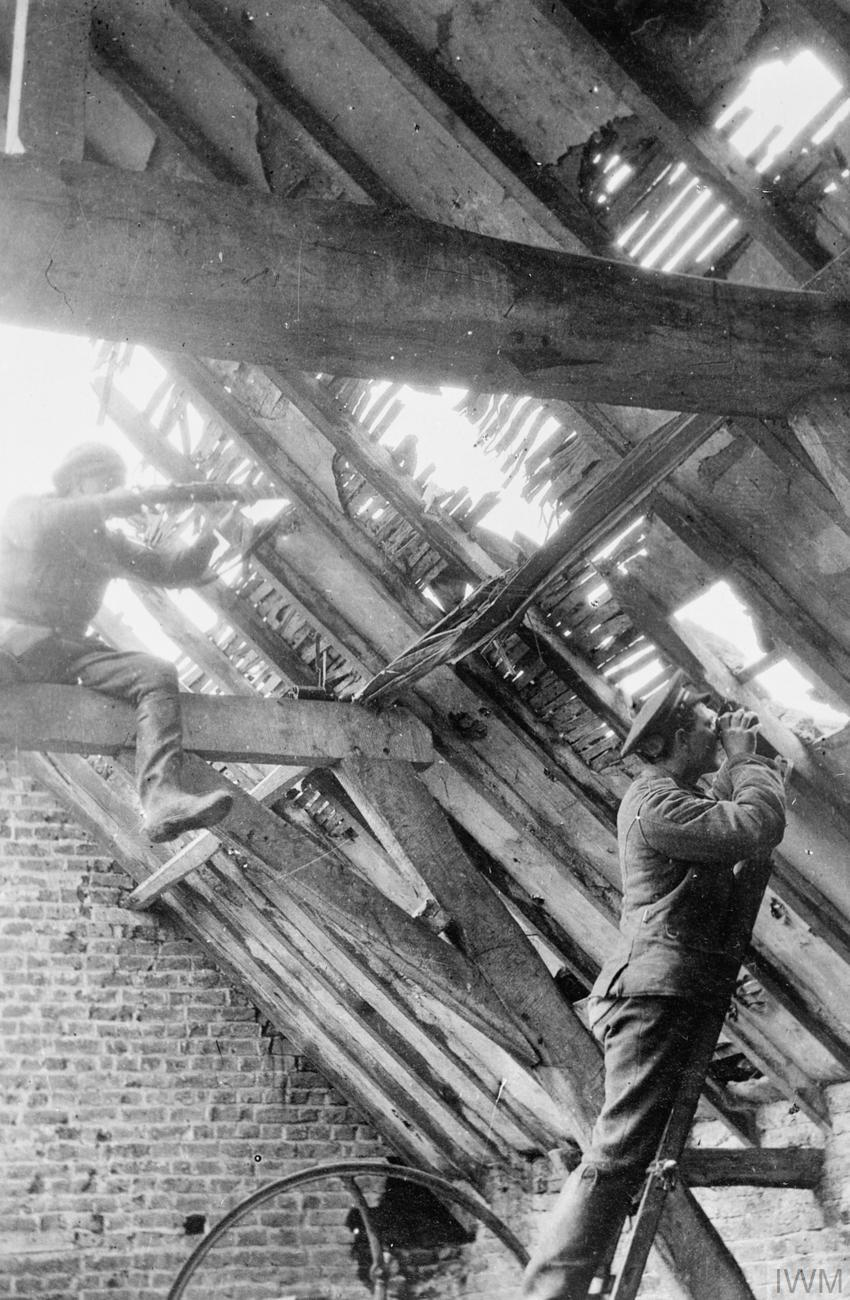
Sniper and observer from the 1/4th Battalion, Royal Berkshire Regiment, in the roof of a barn at Antons Farm near Ploegsteert Wood during the spring of 1915.

The Territorial Force saw a considerable expansion and raised the 1/4th, 2/4th and 3/4th battalions. The 1/4th Battalion was part of the South Midland Brigade of the South Midland Division. In 1915 it was designated the 145th Brigade, 48th (South Midland) Division. They served on the Western Front until 1917 when they were transferred to Italy.

The 2/4th Battalion was formed at Reading, Berkshire, as a duplicate of the 1/4th Battalion and served in the 184th Brigade, part of the 61st (2nd South Midland) Division and, like the majority of the British Army, served on the Western Front during the war.

The 3/4th Battalion was raised in 1915 as a 3rd-Line duplicate of the 1/4th Battalion. The 3/4th remained in Britain for the war supplying drafts and replacements to the other Territorial Force battalions.

==== Kitchener's Army ====
The regiment also raised many service battalions during the war, specifically for war service only. The 5th (Service) Battalion was part of the First New Army, part of Kitchener's Army, and joined the 35th Brigade attached to the 12th (Eastern) Division. They saw their first action in 1915 at Loos. Then, in 1916, the battalion fought at the Battle of Albert and Pozières in 1917. In 1918 the 5th Battalion was transferred to the 36th Brigade, still with 12th Division.

The 6th (Service) Battalion was formed as part of Kitchener's Second New Army and joined the 53rd Brigade, 18th (Eastern) Division and fought at the 1916 Albert battle, Delville Wood and the Battle of Thiepval Ridge. Then, in early 1918, the 6th (Service) Battalion was disbanded in France due to a manpower shortage where all infantry brigades were reduced from four to three infantry battalions to make up for the shortage and the men of the disbanded 6th were sent to the 1st, 2nd and 5th battalions.

The 7th and 8th (Service) battalions were both formed in September 1914 as part of Kitchener's Third New Army and both joined the 26th Division. The 7th Battalion joined the 78th Brigade and moved to Salonika to fight the Bulgarian Army on the Macedonian front in the battles of Horseshoe Hill and Doiran in 1917 and ended the war in Macedonia. The 8th Battalion transferred in 1916 to the 1st Brigade, 1st Division, a Regular Army formation, where they fought in many of the terrible slaughterhouse battles of the war such as the Battle of Aubers Ridge Loos and Passchendaele, the epitome of trench slaughter. They ended the war in Le Cateau, France. During the Battle of Loos, the 8th Battalion attacked Hulluch village and a platoon managed to fight its way into the village, capturing two German field guns and a number of machine guns. 2nd Lieutenant Lawrence was awarded the Military Cross for his exploits.

The 9th (Reserve) Battalion was originally a service battalion of Kitchener's Fourth New Army formed in 1914 until 1915 when it became the 37th Training Reserve Battalion and supplied the service battalions overseas with replacements.

The 10th, 11th, 12th and 13th battalions were all formed in 1916, serving in France and were transferred to the Labour Corps and remained there for the rest of the war.

==== After the war ====
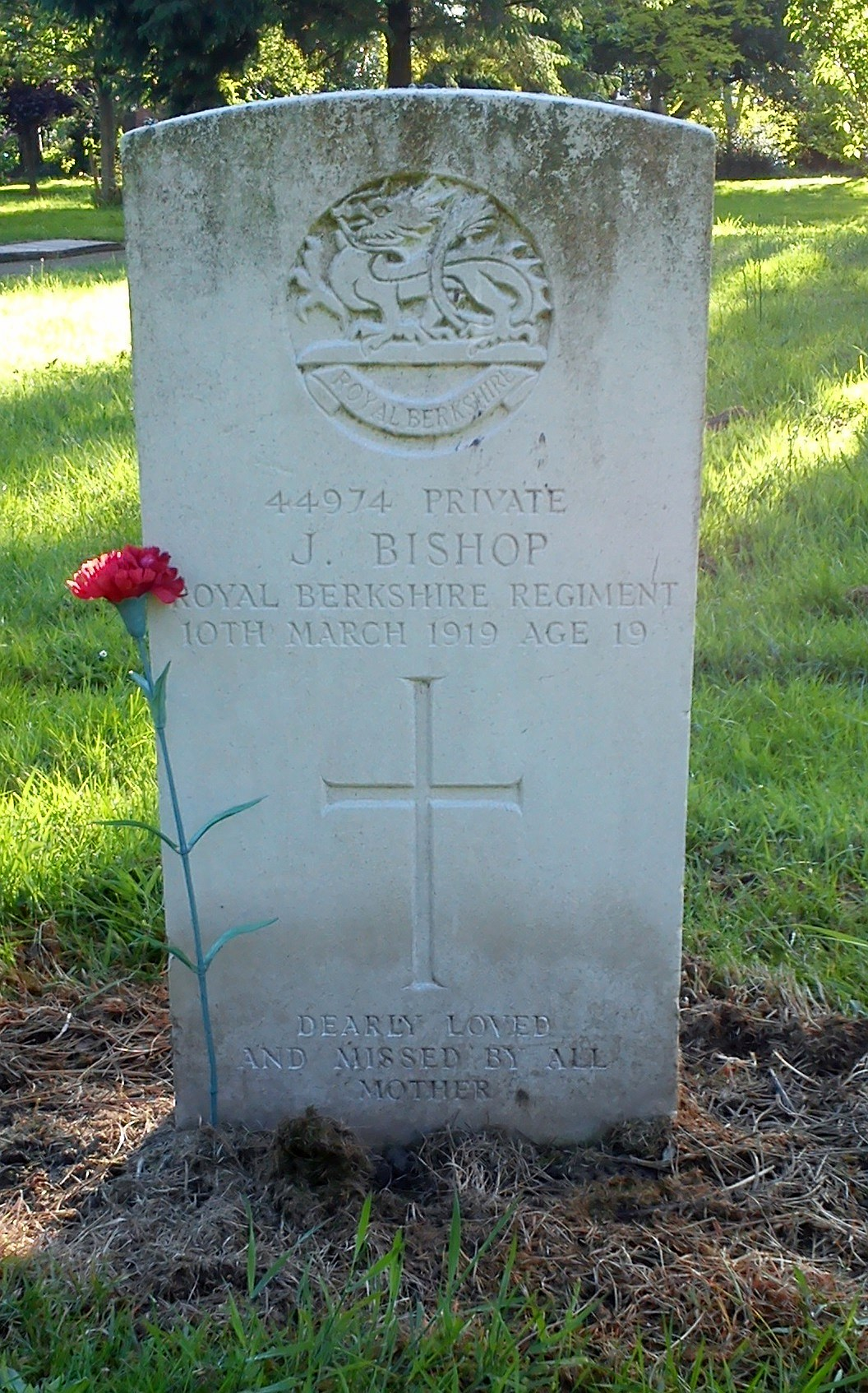
Bromsgrove cemetery, memorial for Private Bishop

Throughout the war, the regiment lost 6,688 men killed and many thousands more wounded. After the Great War, as it was and still is known, was over the 3rd Battalion was disembodied and all the service battalions were disbanded as well as the Territorial Force which was reformed in 1920 as the Territorial Army. Miles Dempsey served with the regiment after being commissioned as a 2nd Lieutenant in 1915, where he was awarded the Military Cross for bravery. He would serve with distinction in the Second World War in France, North Africa, Sicily, Italy and North-Western Europe and became the Commander of the British Second Army from D-Day onwards. In 1921 the titles switched to become the Royal Berkshire Regiment (Princess Charlotte of Wales's).

=== The Second World War ===
The Second World War also saw an expansion for the regiment but not quite to the extent of the Great War. However, casualties were still heavy and the Royal Berkshire Regiment lost 1067 men killed including 974 other ranks and 93 officers killed in action with many hundreds more wounded.

==== Regular Army ====
The 1st Battalion, commanded by Lieutenant Colonel Miles Dempsey, was still assigned to the 6th Infantry Brigade in the 2nd Infantry Division, part of the British Expeditionary Force (BEF) that was sent to France in 1939 after war was declared. They took part in the Battle of France in 1940 and were evacuated during the Battle of Dunkirk.

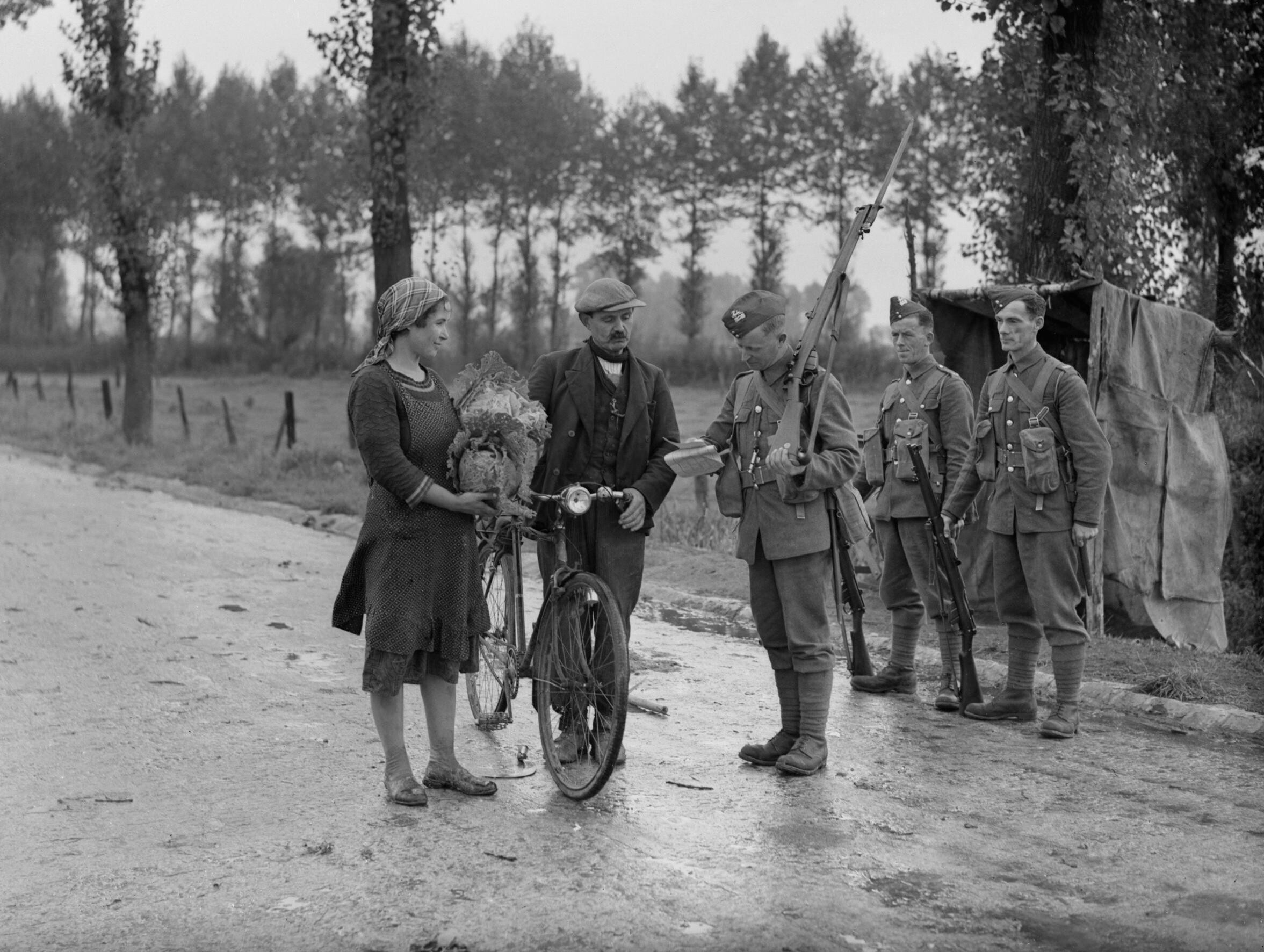
Men of the 1st Battalion, Royal Berkshire Regiment checking the papers of civilians at Becun on the Franco-Belgian border, 10 October 1939.

However, the 2nd Division, 1st Royal Berkshires included, was sent to India in 1942, after the Imperial Japanese Army conquered much of Burma in early 1942. The battalion and division became part of the Fourteenth Army under the command of Lieutenant General William "Bill" Slim. The battalion fought in the Arakan Campaign in late 1942 until June 1943 and later were destined to play a crucial role in the Battle of Kohima the following year, with B Company leading the battalion in relieving the 4th Royal West Kents during the siege. The often savage fighting in Kohima, nicknamed Stalingrad of the East, turned the tide of the campaign in Burma. Entering the Battle around 20 April 1944, the 1st Royal Berkshires continued to fight the Japanese for a further three weeks in horrendous conditions, and suffered just over 50% casualties. From 15 April 1944 to 24 June 1944 the battalion had 52 killed, 290 wounded and 15 missing (357 casualties overall) from an initial fighting strength of 691. The battalion continued to fight in the Burma Campaign, seeing action in the Battle of Meiktila and Mandalay until being withdrawn to India in April 1945.

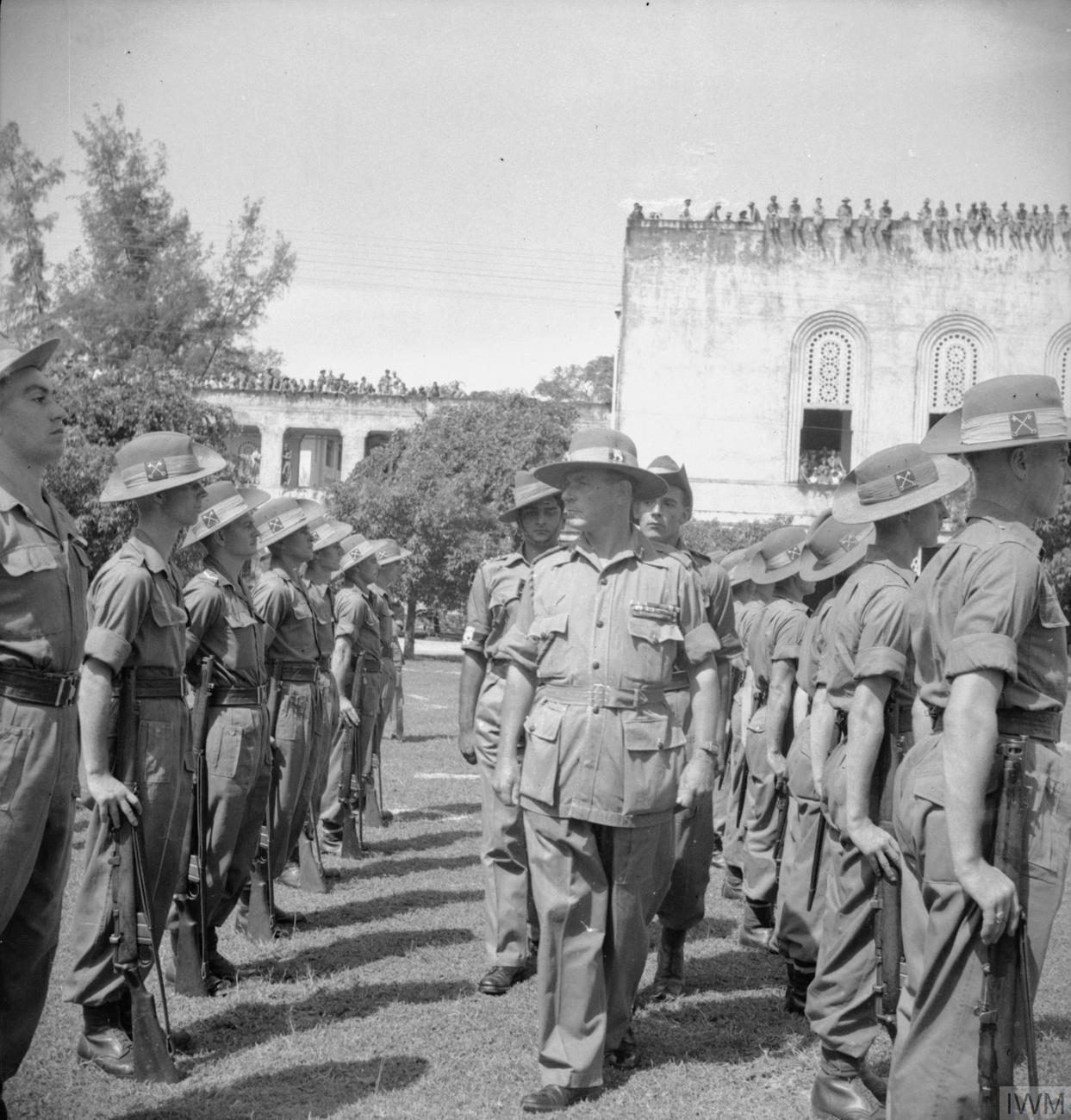
Lieutenant General Sir Montagu Stopford, General Officer Commanding-in-Chief (GOC-in-C) of the British 12th Army, inspects a guard of honour mounted by men of the 1st Battalion, The Royal Berkshire Regiment, during the formal ceremony in Rangoon where General Heitarō Kimura and his staff handed over their swords to staff officers of the 12th Army.

As in the First World War, the 2nd Battalion was stationed in India at the outbreak of war and remained there for the duration. From the outbreak of war until August 1940, the battalion served with the 6th Indian Infantry Brigade. In January 1943 the battalion was assigned to 98th Indian Infantry Brigade, part of 19th Indian Infantry Division and, like the 1st Battalion, also served in the Burma Campaign under the command of Fourteenth Army. A memorial plaque stands at the entrance to a pagoda near the top of Mandalay Hill. It was erected in honour of the men of the 2nd Battalion Royal Berkshire Regiment who fought and died there and reads;

Erected to commemorate the fierce fighting in the clearance and final capture of Mandalay Hill by the 2nd Bn. The Royal Berkshire Regiment, March 10th to 12th 1945.

The battalion continued to fight the Japanese until the war against Japan ended on Victory over Japan Day.

==== Territorial Army ====
The 4th Battalion was a 1st Line Territorial Army unit serving in 145th Infantry Brigade, 48th (South Midland) Infantry Division. It was sent overseas to France in early January 1940 with the rest of 48th Division and, in February, it was exchanged for the 2nd Battalion, Gloucestershire Regiment to the 8th Infantry Brigade, part of 3rd Infantry Division under Major-General Bernard Montgomery before, with the rest of the BEF, being evacuated to Dunkirk. After Dunkirk the battalion was posted away and was not part of a field unit but trained intensively for future combat operations, gaining a high standard of fitness and morale. However, in December 1940 the battalion transferred to the 148th Independent Infantry Brigade and served with it in Northern Ireland, and remained with the brigade for the rest of the war. In mid-1942 the battalion moved to Wrotham in Kent and then became an officer cadet training unit for the rest of the war.

The 5th (Hackney) Battalion had previously been 10th, London Regiment before being re-attached to the Rifle Brigade in 1916. It played an important part on Juno Beach during the Normandy Landings, before being disbanded in 1945, re-raised the following year as 648th Heavy Anti-Aircraft Regiment, Royal Artillery (Royal Berkshire) then disbanded finally in 1955.

The 6th Battalion was raised in 1939 as a 2nd Line duplicate of the 4th Battalion, and served in the 184th Infantry Brigade, 61st Infantry Division. The battalion remained with the 61st Division throughout the war. By the time of Victory in Europe Day the battalion was based in Sussex and were re-training several hundred men of the Royal Artillery into infantrymen. Soon afterwards, the battalion were preparing for a move to the Far East to join the 1st and 2nd battalions but the Japanese surrendered before the battalion arrived.

The 7th (Stoke Newington) Battalion was raised in 1939 as a 2nd Line duplicate of the 5th (Hackney) Battalion and joined its parent battalion in the 161st Infantry Brigade, 54th (East Anglian) Division. The battalion spent most of its existence moving around the United Kingdom, mainly in East Anglia, on guard duties and training and preparing for a possible German invasion of England. The battalion never served overseas and was disbanded in September 1942.

==== Hostilities-only ====
The 8th (Home Defence) Battalion was formed in November 1939 from No. 84 Group, National Defence Companies. The battalion was created specifically for home defence purposes and consisted mainly of men mainly in a lower medical category and younger soldiers unable to be conscripted and eventually it grew to 2,000 strong. In 1940 the younger soldiers of the battalion were split and formed a new 70th (Young Soldiers) Battalion and in 1941 the 8th Battalion was re-designated as the 30th Battalion.

The 9th Battalion, nicknamed The Farmer's Boys, was formed in June 1940 at Reading and joined the 213th Infantry Brigade (Home) and spent the war in the United Kingdom. The battalion was disbanded in December 1943 due to an increasing shortage of manpower in the Army.

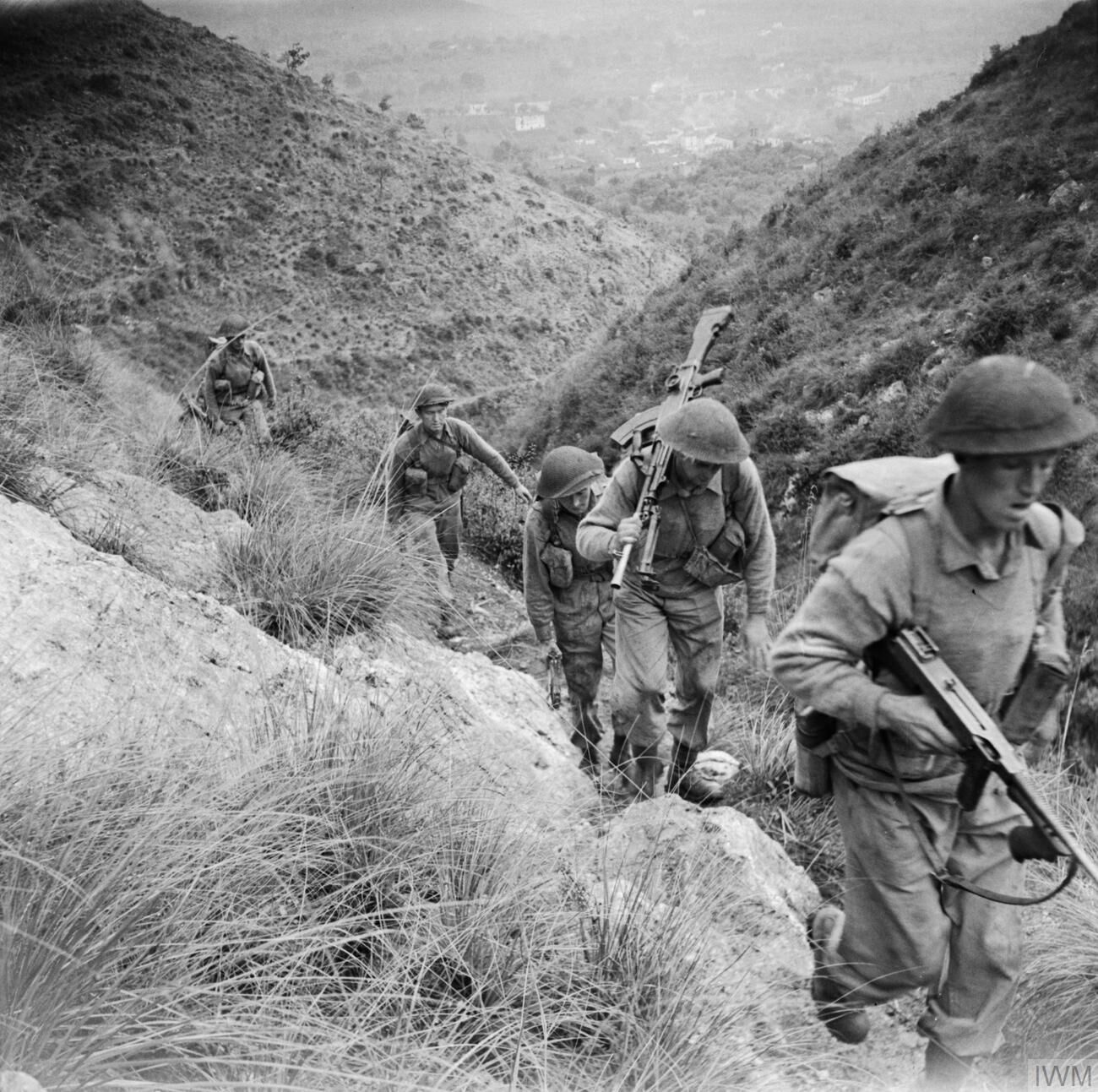
Members of the 10th Battalion, Royal Berkshire Regiment climbing the heights of Calvi Risorta in the invasion of Italy, October 1943

The 50th (Holding) Battalion, Royal Berkshire Regiment was another war-formed unit of the regiment raised in May 1940 in Reading, Berkshire. The 50th (Holding) Battalion's job was to 'hold' men who were homeless, medically unfit or those awaiting orders, on courses or returning from abroad. In late 1940 it was renumbered the 10th Battalion and, in early 1941, joined the 168th (London) Infantry Brigade, 56th (London) Infantry Division. In late 1942 the division was sent to the Middle East. The 168th Brigade was detached to fight with the 50th Division which was understrength after heavy fighting and casualties at Gazala in North Africa. The 168th Brigade took part in Operation Husky, the invasion of Sicily, and then fought in the Italian Campaign back with the 56th Division. The division came under the command of the US Fifth Army under Mark W. Clark for the landings at Anzio, where the battalion endured some of the bitterest fighting of the war so far. Fighting at Anzio was similar to the trench warfare of the Great War. However, due to the severe shortage of manpower in the British Army at the time, and the battalion being the most junior in 56th Division, the battalion was broken up in March 1944 and the men were used as replacements for other infantry units of 56th Division.

The 70th (Young Soldiers) Battalion was raised in 1940 from the younger personnel of the 8th (Home Service) Battalion and mainly consisted of soldiers around the age of 18-19 who had volunteered for the British Army. The battalion spent most of its time guarding areas of the United Kingdom against German invasion and grew to a size of well over 1,000 officers and men, with the hope that they would be able to see action overseas. However, the unit was disbanded in July 1943, as with all such units of other regiments, due to the British government lowering the age of conscription to 18 earlier in the year, and the young soldiers were sent to the front-line battalions of the regiment.

=== Burma ===
The 2nd Royal Berkshire Battalion were based in Burma and paraded at the Independence Day ceremony on the 3 January 1948, leaving that day.

=== Amalgamation ===
After the Second World War, all hostilities-only battalions were disbanded, and the 4th and 6th battalions were amalgamated. In 1959 the regiment was amalgamated with The Wiltshire Regiment (Duke of Edinburgh's) into The Duke of Edinburgh's Royal Regiment (Berkshire and Wiltshire).

== Regimental museum ==
The Rifles Berkshire and Wiltshire Museum is based in Salisbury.

== Colonels ==
The colonels of the regiment were as follows:

- 1881–1891: General Thomas Henry Johnston (formerly colonel of 66th Foot)
- 1891–1894: General Sir William Pollexfen Radcliffe, KCB
- 1894–1905: Lieutenant-General Robert William Lowry, CB
- 1905–1913: Major-General Sir William Bellairs, KCMG, CB
- 1913–1930: Major-General Edward Thompson Dickson
- 1930–1940: General Sir Felix Fordati Ready CB, CSI, CMG, CSO
- 1940–1947: Major-General Robert John Collins
- 1947–1956: General Sir Miles Dempsey
- 1956–1959: Brigadier Dudley William Bruce Trower Hogg

== Battle Honours ==
The regiment's selected battle honours were as follows:

- Early Wars
  - St. Lucia 1778, Egmont-op-Zee, Copenhagen, Douro, Talavera, Albuhera, Queenstown, Vittoria, Pyrenees, Nivelle, Nive, Orthes, Peninsula, Alma, Inkerman, Sevastopol, Kandahar 1880, Afghanistan 1879–80, Egypt 1882, Tofrek, Suakin 1885, South Africa 1899–1902
- The First World War:
  - Mons, Marne 1914, Ypres 1914 '17, Neuve Chapelle, Loos, Arras 1917 '18, Cambrai 1917, Selle, Vittorio Veneto, Doiran 1917 '18
- The Second World War:
  - Dunkirk, Burma 1942–45, Sicily, Damiano, Anzio, Kohima, Normandy Landing, Rhine, Mandalay, Fort Dufferin

== Freedoms ==
The regiment has received the Freedom of several locations throughout its history; these include:

- (England) 1955: Abingdon.
- (England) 1959: Windsor and Maidenhead.

== Sources ==
- Beckett, Ian (2003). Discovering English County Regiments. Shire. ISBN 978-0-7478-0506-9.
- Edwards, Leslie (2009), Kohima: The Furthest Battle, Stroud: The History Press, pp. 443–446, ISBN 978-1-86227-488-4
- Mills, T.F. "The Royal Berkshire Regiment (Princess Charlotte of Wales's)". Archive of regiments.org. Archived from the original on 28 October 2005. Includes chronological index of titles.
