= Shanghai Defence Force =

The Shanghai Defence Force was a tri-service military formation established by the British Government to protect European nationals and their property in Shanghai from Chinese nationalist forces during a period of tension in 1927.

== History ==
Following the Xinhai Revolution in China, the country was divided between warlords in 1912. In January 1927 the British Concession in Hankou was invaded by nationalist forces undertaking their Northern Expedition which sought to unify China. Following a request from the Commander-in-Chief, China Station the Shanghai Defence Force was established under the leadership of Major-General John Duncan later that month amidst concerns that British lives and properties were at risk during the unrest in China at the time. King's College was requisitioned to be the quarters and hospital for the Shanghai Defence Force from February to December 1927. Royal Air Force China Command at Hong Kong was established to administer Royal Air Force units in the region. Tension finally eased in August of that year and troops were withdrawn towards the end of the year.

It was one of the earliest, and perhaps the first, overseas deployment of mechanised artillery. The Experimental Mechanised Force's 11 and 80 batteries formed part of it, armed with QF 18-pounder guns. The guns had previously been towed by Vickers Light Dragon Mark IIs, and were re-equipped with Crossley-Kegresse half-tracks and Burford-Kégresse half-tracks to join the Shanghai Defence Force.

== Formations ==
- 13th Infantry Brigade
- 1st Battalion, Middlesex Regiment
- 1st Battalion, Cameronians (Scottish Rifles)
- 1st Battalion, Border Regiment
- 1st Battalion, Green Howards
- 14th Infantry Brigade
- 2nd Battalion Coldstream Guards
- 1st Battalion, Bedfordshire and Hertfordshire Regiment
- 2nd Battalion, Border Regiment
- 1st Battalion, Devonshire Regiment
- 20th Indian Infantry Brigade
- 2nd Battalion, Gloucestershire Regiment
- 2nd Battalion, Durham Light Infantry
- 4th Battalion, 1st Punjab Regiment
- 3rd Battalion, 14th Punjab Regiment

== See also ==
- Shanghai Volunteer Corps
