= 65th Brigade (United Kingdom) =

Formation in the British Army during World War I

The 65th Brigade was a formation of the British Army. It was raised as part of the new army also known as Kitchener's Army and assigned to the 22nd Division and served on the Western Front and the Macedonian Front during the First World War.

== Organisation ==
These infantry battalions did not all serve at once, but all were assigned to the brigade during the war.

- 14th Battalion, King's (Liverpool Regiment)
- 12th Battalion, Lancashire Fusiliers
- 9th Battalion, East Lancashire Regiment
- 8th Battalion, South Wales Borderers
- 65th Machine Gun Company
- 65th SAA Section Ammunition Column
- 65th Trench Mortar Battery
