= Steuart Hare =

British Army general (1867–1952)

Major-General Sir Steuart Hare KCMG CB
- Born: September 1867; Alverstoke, Hampshire, England
- Died: October 1952 (aged 84–85)
- Military career
- Allegiance: United Kingdom
- Branch: British Army
- Service years: 1886–1923
- Rank: Major-General
- Unit: King's Royal Rifle Corps
- Commands: 156th (Scottish Rifles) Brigade; 27th Division; 54th (East Anglian) Division
- Conflicts: First World War
- Awards: Knight Commander of the Order of St Michael and St George; Companion of the Order of the Bath

Major-General Sir Steuart Welwood Hare, KCMG, CB (September 1867 – October 1952) was a British Army officer.

== Early military career ==
Educated at Eton College and the Royal Military College, Sandhurst, Hare was commissioned as a lieutenant into the King's Royal Rifle Corps on 5 May 1886. He took part in the Hazara Expedition of 1888, the Miranzai Expedition of 1891, the Isazai Expedition of 1892 and, after being promoted to captain in April 1894, in the Chitral Expedition of 1895.

He was promoted to lieutenant colonel in August 1908 and, after being promoted to colonel in March 1912, was placed on half-pay after having commanded a battalion of the KRRC.

Reverting to normal pay, he became commander of the Lowland Division's Scottish Rifles Brigade, a Territorial Force formation, in August 1912.

== First World War ==
Hare, who in August 1914 was promoted to the temporary rank of brigadier general, took command of the 86th Infantry Brigade, part of the 29th Division, in February 1915. He commanded his brigade during the landing at Cape Helles and was subsequently wounded in the leg during the opening stages of the Gallipoli campaign in April. His injuries necessitated his evacuation to England later in the year.

In December 1915 he took over the 82nd Infantry Brigade, part of the 27th Division, which was in the process of transferring from the Western Front to the Macedonian front. He was briefly acting commander of the 27th Division from January to February 1916.

After that he was promoted again, this time to the temporary rank of major general, and became general officer commanding (GOC) of the 54th (East Anglian) Division in April 1916 and commanded the division in Egypt and then in the First, Second and Third Battles of Gaza in 1917 and the Battle of Megiddo in September 1918 in Palestine. He was appointed a Companion of the Order of the Bath in January 1917, the same month in which his rank of major general became substantive. He was appointed a Knight Commander of the Order of St Michael and St George in June 1919.

== Postwar and final years ==
The division was demobilised in September 1919, but he continued to command it in its newly reconstituted form as a Territorial Army (TA) formation until he retired from the army in July 1923.

He lived at Blairlogie Castle, Blairlogie, Stirlingshire.

== Works ==
- Hare, Sir Steuart (1929). Annals of the King's Royal Rifle Corps, Volume 4, The KRRC 1872-1913. Naval and Military Press.
- Hare, Sir Steuart (1929). Annals of the King's Royal Rifle Corps, Volume 5, The Great War. Naval and Military Press.

== Bibliography ==
- Davies, Frank (1997). Bloody Red Tabs: General Officer Casualties of the Great War 1914–1918. London: Pen & Sword Books. ISBN 978-0-85052-463-5.

Military offices
Preceded by Francis Inglefield	GOC 54th (East Anglian) Division; 1916–1923	Succeeded by John Duncan
