= 26th Division (United Kingdom) =

- Formation sign of the 26th Division, a strip of blue cloth on the shoulder strap.
- Active: September 1914 – 10 May 1919
- Country: United Kingdom
- Branch: British Army
- Type: Infantry
- Size: Division
- Engagements: World War I

The 26th Division was an infantry division of the British Army during World War I. The division was created in September 1914 from men volunteering for Lord Kitchener's New Armies and was the last division to be raised under the K3 enlistment scheme. Although the 26th Division began to assemble in September 1914, it was not fully deployed on the Western Front until the following year. In November 1915, the division was redeployed to the Macedonian Front, where it remained until the end of the war.

== Unit history ==
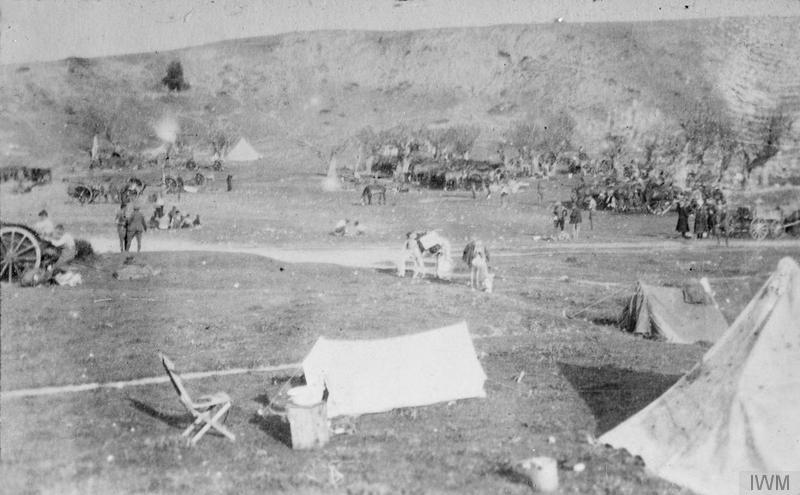
"C" (Howitzer) Battery of CXVII (howitzer) Brigade, Royal Field Artillery, in the Salonika Campaign.

The Division was one of the six created for the Third New Army on 13 September 1914.

It moved to France in September 1915 and then transferred to Salonika in November 1915. It saw action at the Battle of Horseshoe Hill in August 1916, the Battles of Doiran in April / May 1917, and the Third Battle of Doiran as well as the Pursuit to the Strumica Valley in September 1918.

Demobilization began in February 1919, and the division was formally disbanded on 10 May 1919.

== General officers commanding ==
Rank	Name	Dates	Notes	Ref.
Major-General	E. C. W. Mackenzie-Kennedy	18 September 1914 – 4 January 1917	Moved to command XII Corps	
Brigadier-General	A. W. Gay	4 January – 10 March 1917	Temporary	
Major-General	A. W. Gay	10 March – 7 July 1917	Sick 7/7/17	
Brigadier-General	A. J. Poole	7 July – 2 August 1917	Acting	
Major-General	A. W. Gay	2 August – 27 September 1917		
Brigadier-General	H. D. White-Thompson	27 September – 4 November 1917	Acting	
Major-General	A. W. Gay	4 November 1917 – 10 May 1919		

== Order of Battle ==
The order of battle was as follows:

77th Brigade

- 8th (Service) Battalion, Royal Scots Fusiliers
- 11th (Service) Battalion, Cameronians (Scottish Rifles)
- 10th (Service) Battalion, Black Watch (left 30 June 1918)
- 12th (Service) Battalion, Argyll & Sutherland Highlanders
- 77th Machine Gun Company (joined 24 July 1916)
- 77th Trench Mortar Battery (joined 3 November 1916)

78th Brigade

- 9th (Service) Battalion, Gloucestershire Regiment (left 4 July 1918)
- 11th (Service) Battalion, Worcestershire Regiment
- 7th (Service) Battalion, Ox & Bucks. Light Infantry
- 7th (Service) Battalion, Royal Berkshire Regiment
- 78th Machine Gun Company (joined 22 July 1916)
- 78th Trench Mortar Battery (joined 12 November 1916)

79th Brigade

- 10th (Service) Battalion, Devonshire Regiment
- 8th (Service) Battalion, Duke of Cornwall's Light Infantry
- 12th (Service) Battalion, Hampshire Regiment
- 7th (Service) Battalion, Wiltshire Regiment (left 16 June 1918)
- 79th Machine Gun Company (joined 15 July 1916)
- 79th Trench Mortar Battery (joined 3 November 1916)

Divisional Troops

- 10th (Service) Battalion, the Gloucestershire Regiment (left August 1915)
- 8th (Service) Battalion, the Ox & Bucks. Light Infantry (became Divisional Pioneer Battalion in February 1915)
- 8th (Service) Battalion, the Royal Berkshire Regiment (left August 1915)
- Divisional Mounted Troops
  - A Sqn, the Lothians and Border Horse Yeomanry (joined 30 July 1915, left 29 November 1916)
  - 26th Divisional Cyclist Company, Army Cyclist Corps (formed 4 January 1915, left 16 December 1916)
- 26th Divisional Train ASC
  - 202nd, 203rd, 204th and 205th Companies ASC (transferred to 32nd Division November 1915)
  - 112th, 113th, 114th and 115th Coys ASC (joined from 11th (Northern) Division))
- 38th Mobile Veterinary Section AVC
- 817th Divisional Employment Company (formed October 1917)

Divisional Artillery

- CXIV Brigade, RFA
- CXV Brigade, RFA
- CXVI Brigade, RFA
- CXVII Brigade, RFA (left 9 August 1917 for 74th (Yeomanry) Division)
- 26th Divisional Ammunition Column RFA (transferred to XII Corps Ammunition Column, 22 January 1917)
- 131st Heavy Battery, RGA (raised with the Division, joined XXIII Heavy Artillery Brigade on 12 March 1916)
- LVII Brigade, RFA (joined September 1917)
- XXXI Brigade, RFA (attached 17 June to 24 August 1917)
- IV Highland (Mountain) Brigade, RGA (attached in August 1918)

Royal Engineers

- 95th Field Company (left 29 January 1915 for 16th (Irish) Division)
- 96th Field Company (left 1 February 1915 for 20th (Light) Division)
- 107th Field Company (joined 30 January 1915 from 35th Division)
- 108th Field Company (joined 30 January 1915 from 35th Division)
- 131st Field Company (joined 25 April 1915)
- 26th Divisional Signals Company

Royal Army Medical Corps

- 78th Field Ambulance (joined 25 August 1915)
- 79th Field Ambulance (joined 25 August 1915)
- 80th Field Ambulance (joined 25 August 1915)
- 43rd Sanitary Section

== See also ==
- List of British divisions in World War I

== Bibliography ==
- Becke, A. F. (1938). Order of Battle of Divisions Part 3A. London: His Majesty's Stationery Office.
- Chappell, Mike (1986). British Battle Insignia (1). 1914-18. Oxford: Osprey Publishing. ISBN 9780850457278.
