= Robert William Lowry (British Army officer) =

British Army officer (1824–1905)

Lieutenant-General Robert William Lowry CB
- Born: 20 March 1824; Drumreagh, County Tyrone
- Died: 8 June 1905 (aged 81)
- Military career
- Allegiance: United Kingdom
- Branch: British Army
- Rank: Lieutenant-General
- Conflicts: Crimean War; Fenian raids
- Awards: Companion of the Order of the Bath

Lieutenant-General Robert William Lowry CB (20 March 1824 – 8 June 1905) was a British Army officer who became colonel of the Royal Berkshire Regiment (Princess Charlotte of Wales's).

== Military career ==
Educated in Dungannon and Belfast, Lowry was commissioned into the 47th (Lancashire) Regiment of Foot and served with his regiment in the Crimean War in Winter 1854 and then in Malta in January 1857. He commanded field forces in the Fenian raids in 1866. He became colonel of the Royal Berkshire Regiment (Princess Charlotte of Wales's) in 1894 and died in 1905.
