= 22nd Division (United Kingdom) =

- Division formation sign, a strip of black cloth on the shoulder strap.
- Active: September 1914–1919
- Country: United Kingdom
- Branch: British Army
- Type: Infantry
- Size: Division
- Engagements: World War I

Commanders
- Notable commanders: Sir John Duncan

The 22nd Division was an infantry division of the British Army during World War I, raised in September 1914, from men volunteering for Lord Kitchener's New Armies. The division moved to France in September 1915, but it was transferred to Greece only one month later. It served in the Balkans Campaign for the duration of the First World War.

The 22nd Division's insignia was a solid black bar.

== Unit history ==
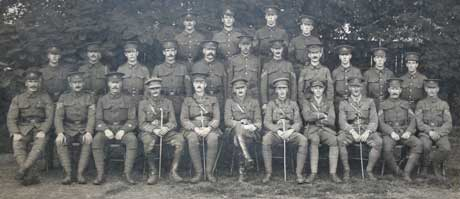
Officers and non-commissioned officers of "C" Company, 9th (Service) Battalion, King's Own Royal Regiment (Lancaster), at Aldershot, Hampshire, August 1915.

The 22nd Division was one of the six created for the Third New Army on 13 September 1914.

It moved to France in early September 1915 and then to Salonika in October 1915 seeing action in the Retreat from Serbia in December 1915, the Battle of Horseshoe Hill in August 1916, the Battle of Machukovo in September 1916 and the Battle of Doiran in April / May 1917.

The 22nd Division was disbanded by 31 March 1919.

== Order of Battle ==
The following units served with the division:
65th Brigade

- 9th (Service) Battalion, King's Own (Royal Lancaster Regiment)
- 14th (Service) Battalion, King's (Liverpool Regiment) (left 11 June 1918)
- 12th (Service) Battalion, Lancashire Fusiliers (left 2 July 1918)
- 9th (Service) Battalion, East Lancashire Regiment
- 8th (Service) Battalion, South Wales Borderers (joined June 1918)
- 65th Machine Gun Company (joined 14 July 1916)
- 65th Trench Mortar Battery (joined 3 November 1916)

66th Brigade

- 9th (Service) Battalion, Border Regiment (left February 1915)
- 9th (Service) Battalion, Prince of Wales's Volunteers (South Lancashire Regiment)
- 8th (Service) Battalion, King's (Shropshire Light Infantry)
- 13th (Service) Battalion, Manchester Regiment (left 28 June 1918)
- 12th (Service) Battalion, Cheshire Regiment (joined February 1915)
- 66th Machine Gun Company (joined 14 July 1916)
- 66th Trench Mortar Battery (joined 5 November 1916)

67th Brigade

- 11th (Service) Battalion, Royal Welsh Fusiliers
- 7th (Service) Battalion, South Wales Borderers
- 8th (Service) Battalion, South Wales Borderers (left 30 June 1918)
- 11th (Service) Battalion, Welsh Regiment
- 67th Machine Gun Company (joined 14 July 1916)
- 67th Trench Mortar Battery (joined 4 November 1916)

Divisional Troops

- 12th (Service) Battalion, Cheshire regiment (left February 1915)
- 10th (Service) Battalion, Loyal North Lancashire Regiment (left April 1915)
- 9th (Service) Battalion, North Staffordshire Regiment (left April 1915)
- 9th (Service) Battalion, Border Regiment (joined as Divisional Pioneer Battalion in February 1915)
- 10th (Service) Battalion, Hampshire Regiment (joined January 1919, left February 1919)
- 2nd Battalion, the QVO Rajput Light Infantry (attached January to February 1919)
- 10th (Service) Battalion, the Hampshire Regiment (joined January 1919, left February 1919)
- 1/10th Battalion, Jat Regiment (attached in January 1919)
- 95th Russell's Infantry (attached January to February 1919)
- Divisional Mounted Troops
  - D Sqn, Lothians and Border Horse Yeomanry (joined July 1915, left 29 November 1916)
  - 22nd Divisional Cyclist Company, Army Cyclist Corps (joined February 1915, left November 1916)
- 22nd Divisional Train Army Service Corps
  - 186th, 187th, 188th and 189th Companies (transferred to [30th Division in October 1915)
  - 108th, 109th, 110th and 111th Companies (joined from 10th (Irish) Division in late 1915)
- 34th Mobile Veterinary Section Army Veterinary Corps
- 816th Divisional Employment Company (formed 10 October 1917)

Royal Artillery

- XCVIII Brigade, Royal Field Artillery (R.F.A.)
- XCIX Brigade, RFA
- C Brigade, R.F.A.
- CI Brigade, R.F.A.
- 22nd Divisional Ammunition Column RFA (transferred to XII Corps January 1915)
- 22nd Heavy Battery, Royal Garrison Artillery (R.G.A.) (joined XXIII Heavy Artillery Brigade on 31 August 1915)

Royal Engineers

- 87th Field Company (left February 1915)
- 88th Field Company (left February 1915)
- 99th Field Company (joined February 1915)
- 100th Field Company (joined February 1915)
- 127th Field Company (joined by June 1915)
- 22nd Divisional Signals Company

Royal Army Medical Corps

- 66th Field Ambulance
- 67th Field Ambulance
- 68th Field Ambulance
- 39th Sanitary Section

== General officers commanding ==
General Officers commanding were as follows:

Rank	Name	Dates	Notes	Ref.
Major-General	R. A. Montgomery	17 September 1914 – 17 June 1915		
Major-General	Hon. F. Gordon	17 June 1915 – 7 May 1917	Sick 7/5/17	
Brigadier-General	J. Duncan	7 May 1917 – 24 June 1917	Temporary	
Major-General	J. Duncan	24 June 1917 – March 1919		

== See also ==
- List of British divisions in World War I

== Bibliography ==
- Becke, A. F. (1938). Order of Battle of Divisions Part 3A. London: His Majesty's Stationery Office.
- Chappel M 1986 British Battle Insignia (1). 1914-18 Osprey Publishing ISBN 9780850457278
