= Edward Thompson Dickson =

British Army general (1850–1938)

Major-General Edward Thompson Dickson
- Born: 16 July 1850; London
- Died: 23 August 1938 (aged 88); London
- Military career
- Allegiance: United Kingdom
- Branch: British Army
- Service years: 1869 – 1912
- Rank: Major-General
- Units: 49th Regiment of Foot; Royal Berkshire Regiment
- Commands: 1st Royal Berkshire Regiment; GOC West Africa; West Lancashire Division; Home Counties Division

Major-General Edward Thompson Dickson (16 July 1850 – 23 August 1938) was a British Army general officer, who commanded two Territorial Force divisions before the First World War.

== Military career ==
He was born in St. Helier, Jersey, the son of Major-General E. J. Dickson and his wife Louisa Maria Dickson. After studying at Cheltenham College and the Royal Military College, Sandhurst, he was commissioned as an ensign into the 49th Regiment of Foot in March 1869. In 1881 the regiment amalgamated to become the Princess Charlotte of Wales's (Royal Berkshire Regiment).

In the Suakin Expedition of 1885 he saw action at the Battles of Suakin, Hasheen, Tofrek, and Ginnis, and was appointed brigade-major in the Sudan Field Force. He was later appointed to command the 1st Battalion Royal Berkshire Regiment from 1891 to 1895, and promoted to colonel on 30 April 1895. He was in command of the 49th Regimental District (Royal Berkshire Regiment, based in Reading, Berkshire) from 1 May 1897 to 6 September 1902, when he was placed on half-pay. The following month he was appointed to the staff to command the troops at Barbados, where he arrived in November taking command of the troops in the West Indies, with the local rank of brigadier-general. He was in 1905 promoted to the post of General Officer Commanding the forces in West Africa and was promoted to major general in October 1905. In 1906 he returned to England as the Major-General responsible for administration in Eastern Command, a post he held until 1908. On 1 April that year, he was appointed the first general officer commanding (GOC) of the newly formed West Lancashire Division of the Territorial Force (TF), and in 1909 took command of the Home Counties Division. He remained in command of the division until July 1912, when he retired from the army and retired to Tunbridge Wells.

He was, however, recalled to active service on 28 September 1914 as an inspector of infantry during the early stages of World War I.

Dickson married Helene Frances Harvey, eldest daughter of Colonel W. F. Harvey, in 1878, and they had one daughter.

== Notes ==
Military offices
New title	GOC West Lancashire Division; 1908–1909	Succeeded by Edward Bethune
Preceded by Colin Donald	GOC Home Counties Division; 1909–1912	Succeeded by Charles Townshend
