= Battle of Doiran (1917) =

Battle of World War I

Coordinates: 41°11′15″N 22°43′14″E

- Part of Macedonian front (World War I)
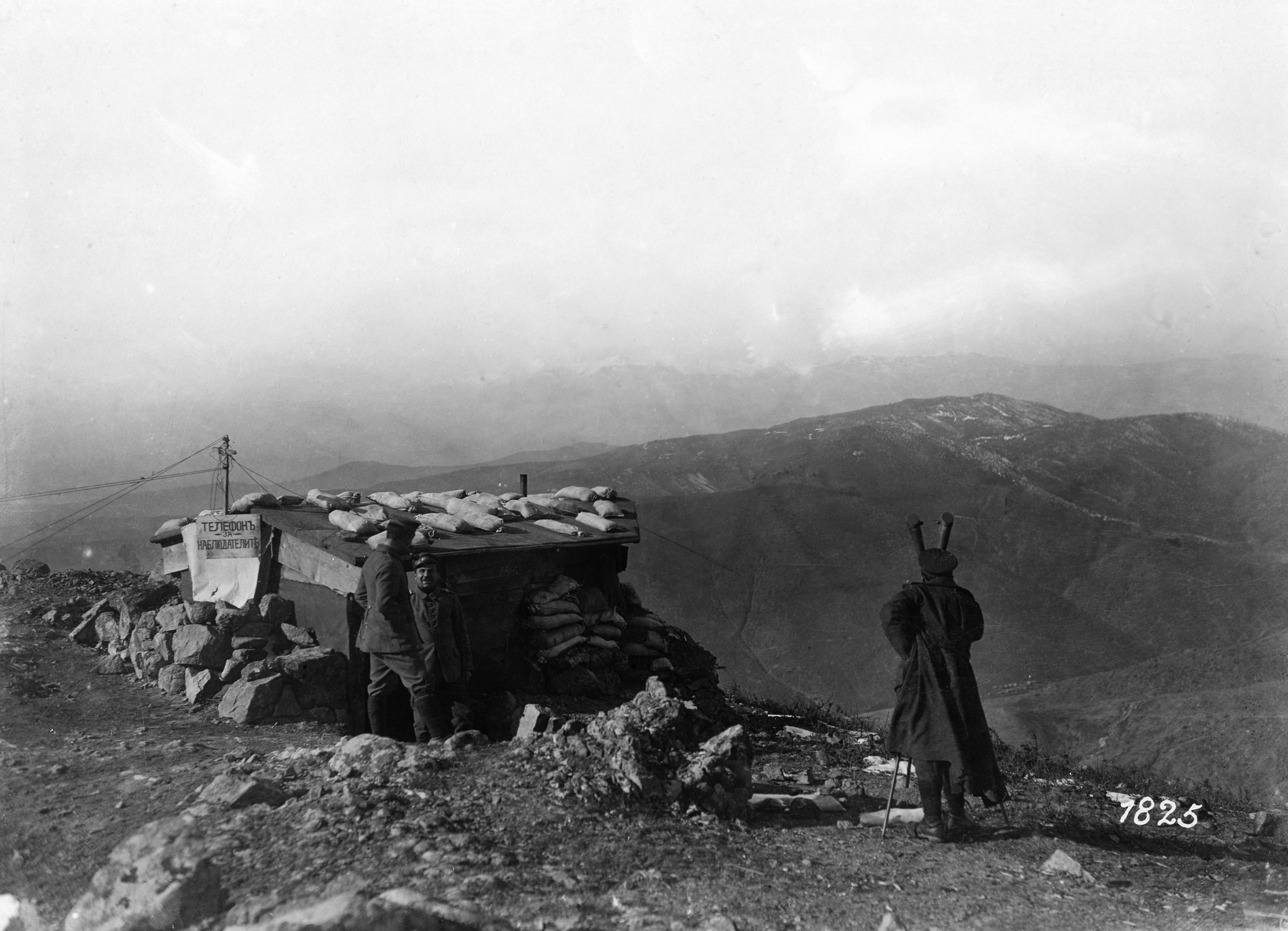
- A Bulgarian telephone station with trench periscope observing the enemy's position at the Doiran front, March 1917 (German Official Photograph/National Archives).
Date	22 April 1917 – 9 May 1917
Location	Doiran Lake, Bulgarian-occupied Kingdom of Serbia (present-day North Macedonia)
Result	Bulgarian victory

Belligerents
Bulgaria	United Kingdom

Commanders and leaders
(Tsardom of Bulgaria (1908–1946)) Vladimir Vazov	(United Kingdom of Great Britain and Ireland) George Milne

Strength
1 Division: 30,000 men; 147 guns; 35 mortars; 130 machine guns	3 Divisions: 43,000 men; 160 guns; 110 mortars; 440 machine guns

Casualties and losses
2,000 men	12,000 men

The Battle of Doiran was a 1917 battle between the United Kingdom and Bulgaria during World War I. The battle ended in decisive Bulgarian victory, leading to 16 months of silence on the front before the Third Battle of Doiran.

== Planning ==
During the Second Conference of the Military Counsel of the Entente in Chantilly, it was decided to continue with the attempts at a breakthrough. The task for the Entente forces on the Macedonian front was to inflict major defeats on the Bulgarian army and effect a breakthrough in the Balkans in a relatively short time. The Allied command, which expected reinforcements, planned a major assault in the direction of Vardar and Doiran. In 1917 the 2nd (Bulgarian) Thracian Infantry Division was replaced at Doiran by the 9th Pleven Infantry Division under the command of Colonel Vladimir Vazov.

== Initial attacks ==
On 9 and 10 February, the Allies attacked the 33rd Svishtov and 34th Troyan Regiments but were repulsed by a decisive counterattack by the Troyan Regiment. The British advance on 21 February was repulsed by Bulgarian artillery after a two-day battle.

The Allied command found that the Bulgarian positions were better fortified than the previous year, so it ordered a systematic artillery barrage on these defences. In the meantime, it continued the development of its forming-up ground, which was 800 – 1,500 m from the defensive lines of the Pleven Division. To make the breakthrough, the British concentrated three divisions (the 22nd, 26th, 60th), with its artillery – more than 43,000 men, 160 guns, 110 mortars and 440 machine-guns. The objective did not differ much from the battle in the previous year; the main blow was on a front of 5–6 km towards Kalatepe.

The prognosis of the Bulgarian command for a significant Allied offensive was confirmed by intelligence. The 9th Pleven Division was reinforced, having 30,000 men, 147 guns, 35 mortars, and 130 machine guns.

According to the orders of the High Command, the front was divided into three zones with different widths: the right from the River Vardar to the Varovita heights with a width of 13 km was defended by 1st Brigade (6 battalions with 48 guns, 12 mortars and 56 machine guns); the central from the Varovita heights to the Karakondzho heights, 4 km wide, defended by the 57th Regiment (3 battalions) and the left from the Karakondzho heights to Doiran Lake, 9 km wide, defended by 2nd Brigade (6 battalions, 76 guns, 19 mortars and 52 machine-guns).

== Defensive positions ==
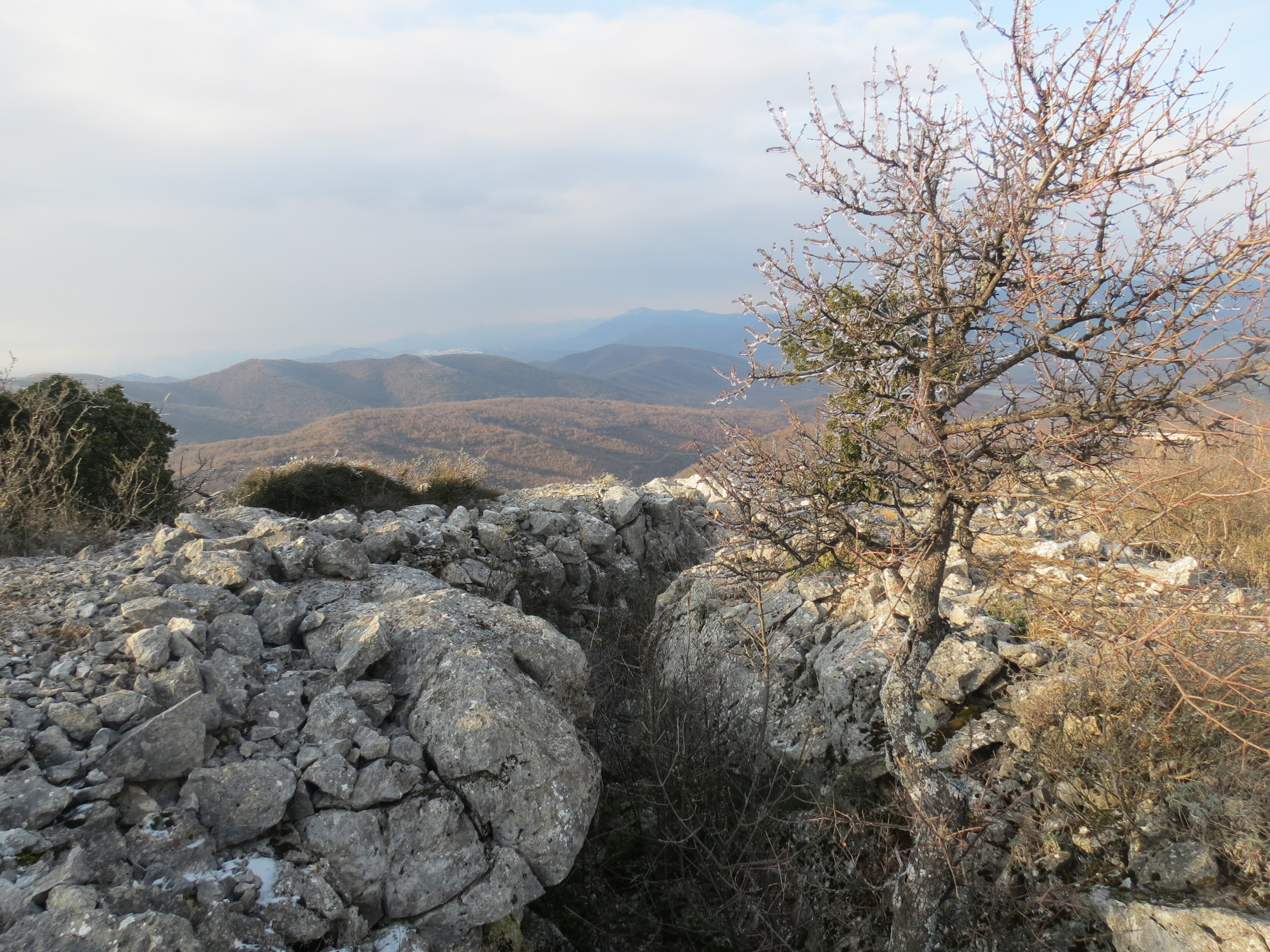
Remains of Bulgarian trenches in Star Dojran, North Macedonia.

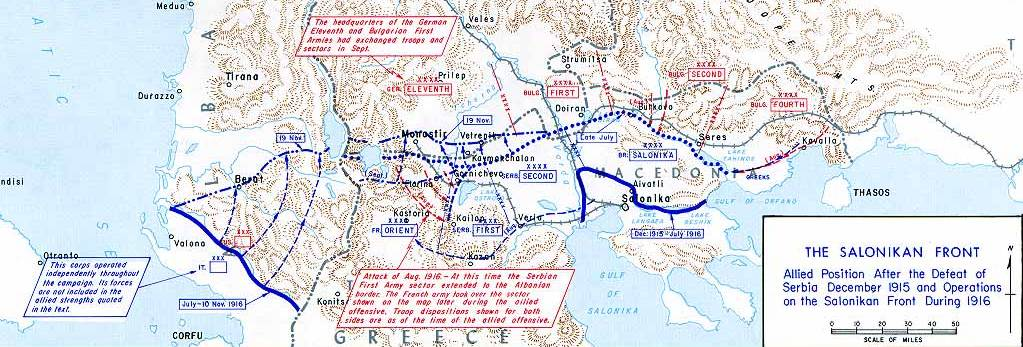
The Macedonian Front in 1916-1917.

In 1917 the Bulgarian defensive positions and fortifications were further improved. It included two prime positions with two rows of continuous trenches 1.5 – 2 metres deep, 200 to 1000 m apart and linked with passages for communication. In front of these positions was a two-line system of wire entanglements. Between the rows of trench watchpoints, shelters, machine-gun nests and sunken batteries were constructed. Behind these defences were concrete galleries, artillery encampments, and ammunition platforms. There were smaller fortifications in front of the primary position, with a partly constructed secondary position 2 – 5 km to its rear.

== The battle ==
The battle for a breakthrough in the Bulgarian positions began on 22 April and continued intermittently until 9 May 1917. The assault began with a bitter four-day artillery barrage in which the British fired about 100,000 shells. As a result, the earthworks and some wooden structures in the front positions were destroyed. The Bulgarians also opened fire from the batteries between Vardar and Doiran. Vladimir Vazov ordered fire day and night on the Allied positions. The initial several-hour struggle between the British and Bulgarian batteries was followed by a one-hour Bulgarian counter-barrage in which 10,000 shells were fired.

The British infantry began its attack on the night of 24–25 April. After a Bulgarian counterattack, the British were repulsed with heavy casualties and, by 8 pm, had retreated. The British assaults on the right and central fronts were also repulsed with heavy casualties after help from the Bulgarian artillery.

The British attacks in the next two days were defeated by constant Bulgarian fire and counterattacks. Due to this fire, the British withdrew to their initial positions on 27 April. The Bulgarians immediately started to reconstruct the destroyed fortifications.

Due to criticism by their high command, the British made new attempts at a breakthrough. On 8 May, after a long artillery barrage, they began another attack. The main assault started at 9 pm with five waves of British troops attacking the Bulgarian positions. After four attacks during the night of 8–9 May, the British were defeated and suffered enormous casualties. A Times correspondent wrote that the British soldiers called the "Boris" point "the valley of death."

Though the artillery duel continued until 9 May, the British had to abandon all attacks due to heavy casualties. They lost 12,000 killed, wounded and captured, of which the Bulgarian defenders buried 2,250. The losses of the Ninth Pleven Infantry Division were 2,000, of whom 900 died from disease and wounds.

Vladimir Vazov was promoted to Major-General.

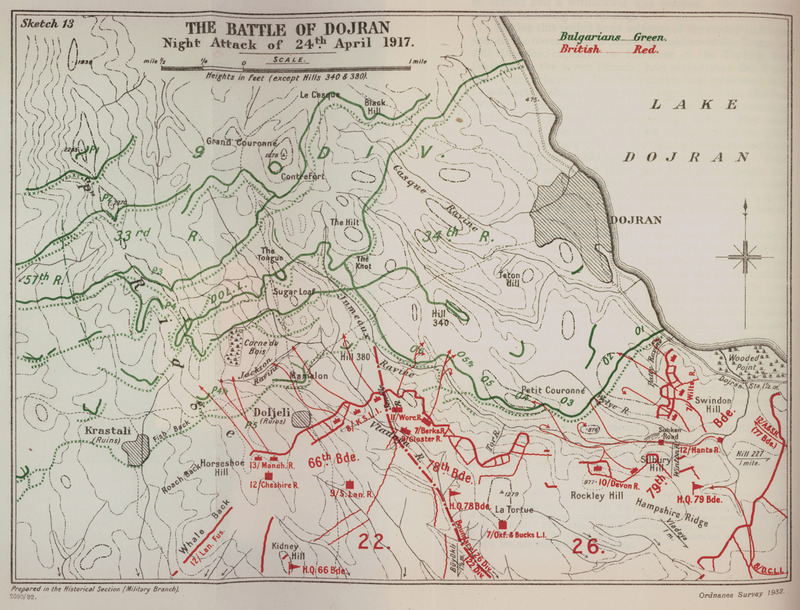
Map of the Allied night attack of 24 April

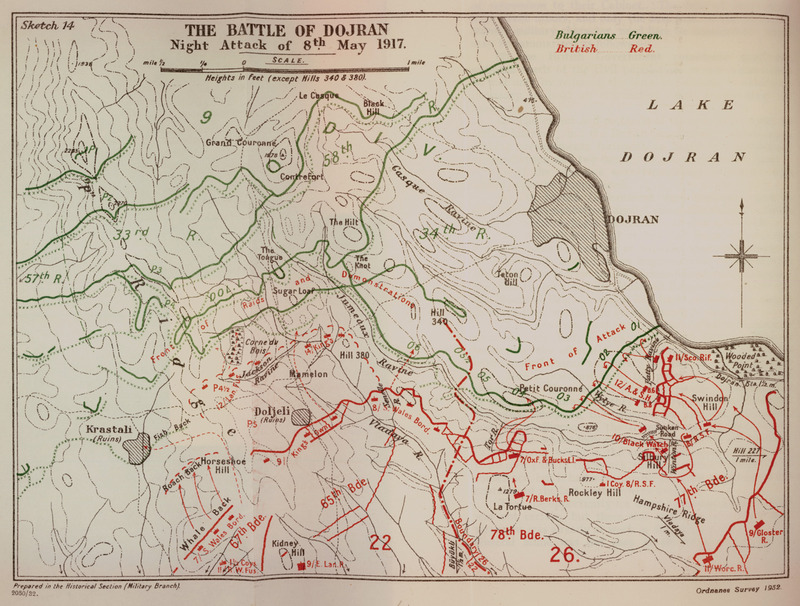
Map of the Allied night attack of 8 May

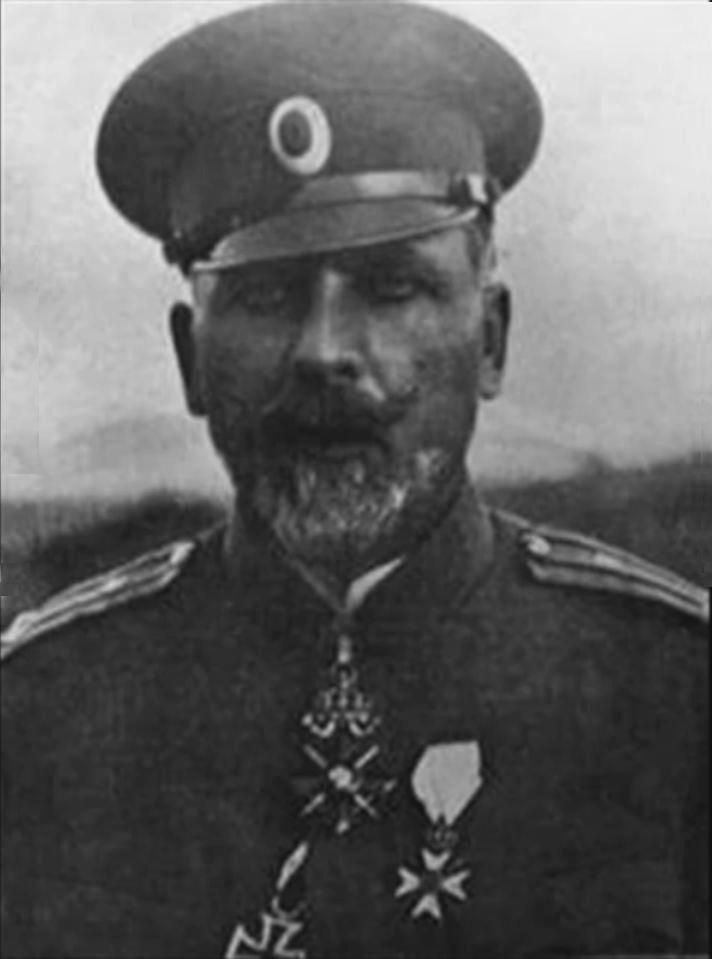
Vladimir Vazov's successful defence of Doiran made him a hero to the Bulgarians

== Aftermath ==
Apart from local skirmishes, the front was quiet during the next 16 months. Both sides used that time to strengthen and consolidate their positions further. In 1918 a massive Anglo-Greek attack was repulsed by the Pleven Division in the Third Battle of Doiran.

== In popular culture ==
The song "The Valley of Death" by Swedish metal band Sabaton for their album "The War to End All Wars" was inspired by the Battle of Doiran.

== Sources ==
- Falls, Cyril Bentham (1933). Military Operations Macedonia. From the Outbreak of War to the Spring of 1917. History of the Great War based on Official Documents. London: His Majesty’s Stationery Office.
