= Hougham =

Hougham can refer to:

== Places ==
- Hougham, Lincolnshire, a village in England
  - Hougham railway station
- Hougham Without, a civil parish in Kent, England, whose settlements include Church Hougham and West Hougham, collectively known as Hougham
  - Hougham Battery, a World War II coastal defence battery
- Hougham Park, a historic farmstead in the Eastern Cape, South Africa

== Other uses ==
- John S. Hougham (1821–1894), Purdue University's first appointed professor
- Robert de Hougham (died 1274), a governor of Rochester Castle

== See also ==
- Huffam, a name
