= 122nd Siege Battery, Royal Garrison Artillery =

122nd Siege Battery, RGA
- Cap Badge of the Royal Regiment of Artillery
- Active: 22 March 1916–1919
- Country: United Kingdom
- Branch: British Army
- Role: Siege Artillery
- Part of: Royal Garrison Artillery
- Garrison/HQ: Brighton
- Engagements: Battle of the Somme; Battle of Arras; German spring offensive Hundred Days Offensive

The 122nd Siege Battery was a heavy howitzer unit of Britain's Royal Garrison Artillery (RGA) raised during the First World War. It saw active service on the Western Front at the Somme and Arras, against the German spring offensive, and in the final Allied Hundred Days Offensive.

== Mobilisation ==
On the outbreak of war in August 1914, units of the part-time Territorial Force (TF) were invited to volunteer for Overseas Service and the majority of the Sussex Royal Garrison Artillery did so. This unit had mobilised as part of No 10 Coastal Fire Command, responsible for the defence of Newhaven. By October 1914, the campaign on the Western Front was bogging down into Trench warfare and there was an urgent need for batteries of siege artillery to be sent to France. The WO decided that the TF coastal gunners were well enough trained to take over many of the duties in the coastal defences, releasing Regular RGA gunners for service in the field. Soon the TF RGA companies that had volunteered for overseas service were also supplying trained gunners to RGA units serving overseas and providing cadres to form complete new units.

A cadre of 3 officers and 78 other ranks (ORs) of the Sussex RGA was assigned to 122nd Siege Battery, RGA, when it was formed at Dover on 22 March 1916. The battery was equipped with four modern 6-inch 26 cwt howitzers and had an ammunition column of Army Service Corps lorries attached to it, including four FWD Model B gun tractors. The battery went out to the Western Front on 18 July 1916

== Service ==
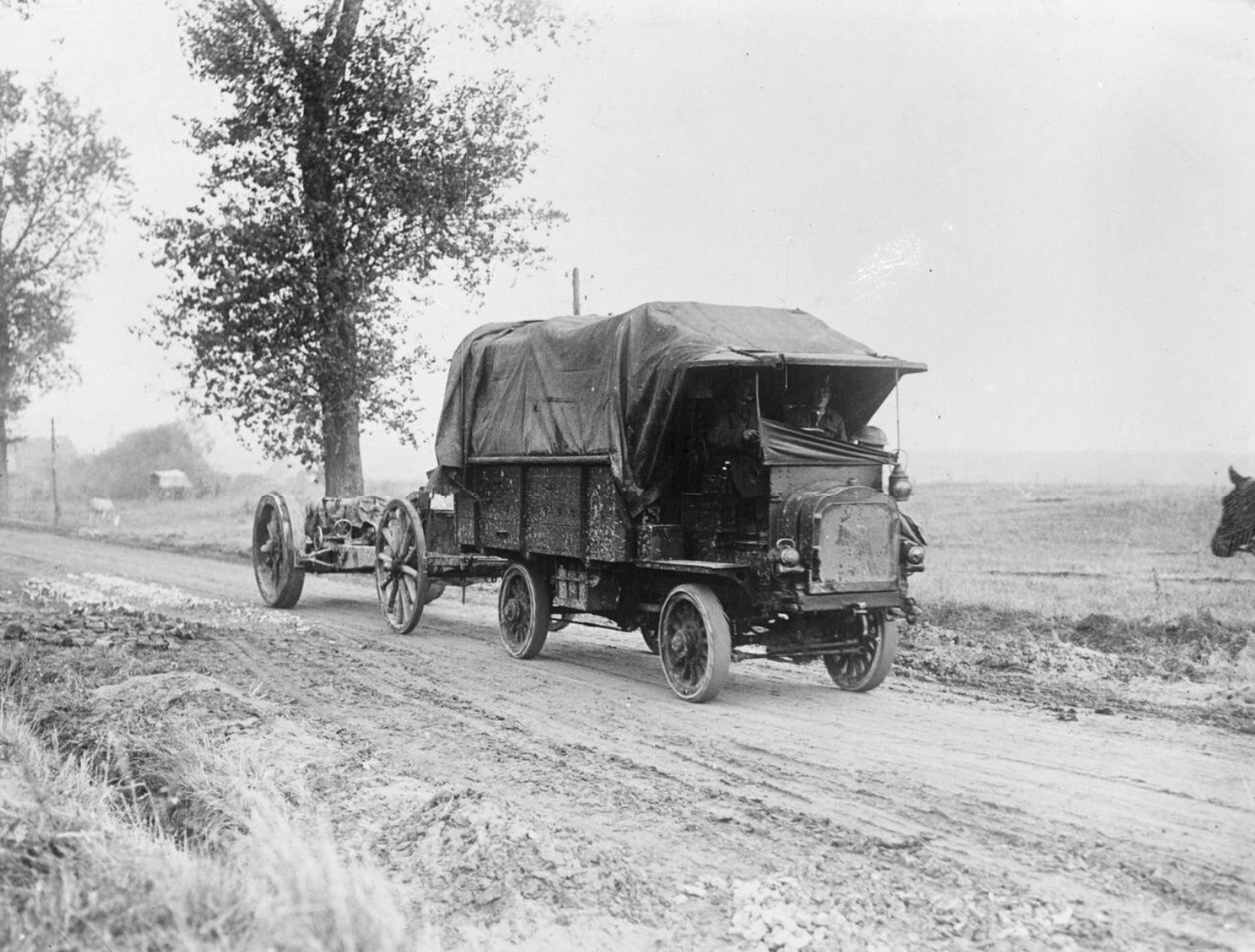
FWD Model B lorry towing a 6-inch 26 cwt howitzer.

The battery went to Beaufort near Arras where on 23 July it joined 8th Heavy Artillery Group (HAG) supporting Third Army. Two days later it began firing to register targets such as Ficheux Mill, the villages of Beaurains and Ransart, the Slag Heap (a nest of machine gunners), a railway bridge and enemy batteries. The Arras sector was relatively quiet during the summer with the emphasis being on the Battle of the Somme further south, but deliberate shoots were carried out with aircraft or balloon observation when weather permitted. On 3 September the battery engaged enemy anti-aircraft batteries to support an attack by the Royal Flying Corps on enemy balloons.

=== Somme ===
In mid-September 8 HAG was ordered to move south with its batteries to Bayencourt to join VII Corps. From 14 September the batteries were engaged in counter-battery (CB) tasks supporting the adjacent Reserve Army attacking on the Somme, particularly the attack on Miraumont on 28 September. On 16 October 122nd Siege Bty transferred to 25th HAG with II Corps in Reserve Army with which it continued CB work and joined in bombardments for the continuing Battle of the Ancre Heights. Reserve Army (renamed Fifth Army) kept attacking during November (the Battle of the Ancre) before the Somme offensive died out.

=== Arras ===
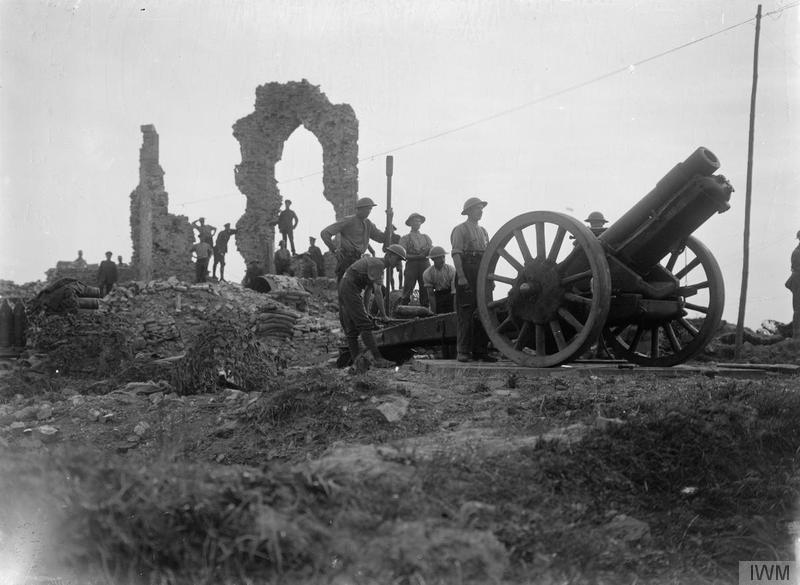
6-inch howitzer and crew at Pilckem September 1917.

In January 1917 122nd Siege Bty moved back to Third Army, intended to join 26th HAG with VI Corps, but actually joined 47th HAG (9 January) and immediately moved to 48th HAG (13 January). The battery was placed 'out of action' on 14 January and from then until 31 January the personnel were employed on ammunition fatigues, etc., then from 1 to 13 February they were engaged in training, overhauling the guns, etc.. By now the battery was commanded by W.F.H. Grinsted, who had been a lieutenant in No 1 Co Sussex RGA on the outbreak of war, promoted to captain on 4 November 1914, and seconded for duty with the Regular RGA from 28 April 1916. He was now an Acting Major.

122nd Siege Bty joined 78th HAG at Anzin-Saint-Aubin on 14 February and moved its guns into position north west of Arras two days later. Third Army was carrying out the artillery preparation for the Battle of Arras, with 78th HAG supporting XVII Corps. The main bombardment was planned to last for five days (V, W, X, Y and Z) beginning on 4 April. On 4 April one of 122nd Siege Bty's howitzers suffered a premature explosion of a shell in the barrel, destroying the gun, killing one gunner and wounding five others. The zone bombarded was divided into small zones without overlapping fire, to help the forward observation officers (FOOs) spot the fall of shot of their own guns. The 6-inch howitzers concentrated on the German second and third defence systems, destroying trenches and strongpoints and cutting barbed wire. Fire on targets was maintained at an even rate in daylight, with pauses for air reconnaissance. Harassing fire (HF) tasks were carried out at night. However, visibility was poor on some of the days, so an additional day (Q) was inserted on 7 April and Z day for the attack (the First Battle of the Scarpe) became 9 April.

Zero hour was 05.30 on 9 April, when the 6-inch howitzers' role in the attack was to lay down a standing barrage on the German support trench. XVII Corps' attack was highly successful, with 9th (Scottish) and 34th Divisions pushing forward to the final objective (the 'Brown Line') as German resistance collapsed. The infantry advanced so quickly that they had to wait for their own standing barrage to lift. The Brown Line was over 7,000 yards (6,400 m) from the most advanced British guns, so 122nd Siege Bty had been ordered to move up as soon as possible. It fired up to 08.30, then packed up and moved to prepared forward positions at Saint-Nicolas just behind the British start line, and reported its guns in position by 12.00. It was reported back 'in action' at 14.15 and reopened fire at 15.24 on targets given by HAG headquarters (HQ).

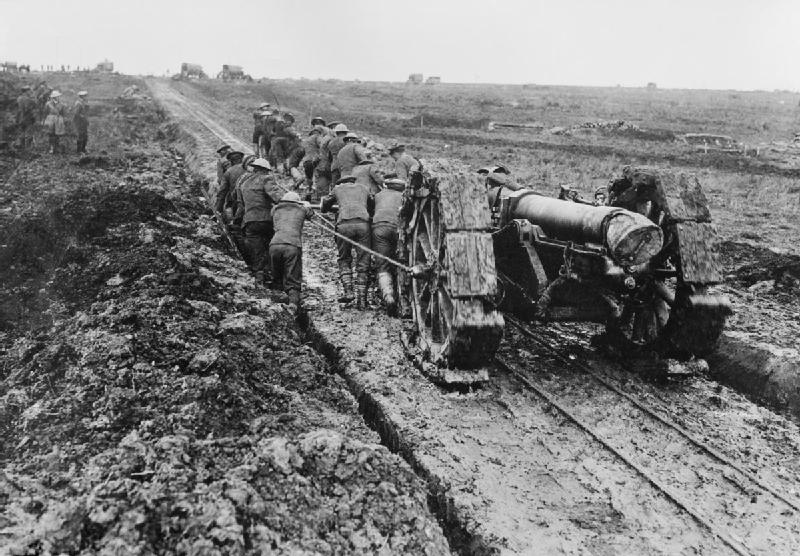
A 6-inch howitzer being moved through mud on as part of Battle of Somme, September 1916

However, progress after 9 April was much slower, with bad weather and ground conditions making it difficult to move guns and supplies forward. The guns continued firing, and on 16 April 122nd Siege Bty moved forward into captured positions at Athies. It participated in bombardments during the continuing offensive, with a three-day bombardment (X, Y and Z) for a major attack on 23 April (the Second Battle of the Scarpe). This time the German artillery was hardly damaged, and the infantry suffered grievous losses in two days of bitter fighting. 78th HAG's batteries continued firing daily on trenches, strongpoints and wire, then another three-day bombardment for 4th Division's attack on Rœux in the Third Battle of the Scarpe. On Z day (3 May) the 6-inch howitzers provided a barrage 300 yards (270 m) in front of the attacking infantry, on the chemical works and the village, then switched to the target trenches codenamed Cyprus, Candy, Cow, Can, Carpet and Cyril. At 10.20 the guns returned to firing on Rœux. Hearing that the railway cutting was full of Germans, 78th HAG turned its guns onto that target, and at 14.10 the howitzers caught a German counter-attack, firing shells with instantaneous fuzes. Nevertheless, the operation failed. The guns kept up their bombardments through May until Rœux and the chemical works were finally captured on 13 May by 4th and 51st (Highland) Divisions. From then until 25 May the guns continued hammering the same familiar trenches, especially the troublesome Cupid trench.

On 25 May, 122nd Siege Bty (still at Athies) was transferred to the command of 68th HAG. This was a designated CB group, though from 9 to 15 June the battery was attached to 22nd HAG for tactical purposes and continued firing at Cupid and other trenches. On 17 June the battery received orders to evacuate its positions, and it moved north to Aix-Noulette, where it came under the orders of 54th HAG. The battery had difficulty getting the guns into position: motor vehicles could not get closer than 400 yards (370 m) from the guns, and all the ammunition had to be carried in by hand.

=== Flanders ===
However, the battery's stay was short, and on 7 July it moved out again to join 19th HAG at Oostduinkerke on the Flanders coast with Fourth Army. The BEF's next planned operation was the Flanders Offensive, aiming to break through at Ypres, with a follow-up attack by Fourth Army along the coast supported by amphibious landings (Operation Hush).

The construction of 122nd Siege Bty's new positions was hindered by accurate enemy shellfire (the wireless aerial was shot down), but the battery had its guns in position by 12 July and it began firing CB tasks. It was made up to an establishment of six howitzers when a section (1 officer and 55 ORs) of the newly arrived 382nd Siege Bty joined on 30 July 1917. This battery had been formed at Prees Heath Camp on 15 February and arrived on the Western Front on 18 July equipped with four 6-inch howitzers. It joined XV Corps on 29 July and was immediately split up, one section posted to 122nd Siege Bty, the other to 182nd Siege Bty.

Throughout August and September the battery fired on hostile batteries with air observation or direct observation by FOOs, but regularly suffered damage and casualties from incoming CB fire. With the help of a tunnelling company of the Royal Engineers the battery constructed a tunnel under the sand dunes to its gun positions. The battery cleared a trainload of ammunition from another battery's abandoned position, but the railway being damaged the train had to be parked in a siding, where it was blown up by a German shell.

=== Winter 1917–18 ===
The Flanders coast operation had been frequently postponed while the Ypres Offensive failed to break through. By October it had been cancelled and many of the troops released from the coast to reinforce the fighting at Ypres. However, it was not until 1 December 1917 that the battery was ordered south to join 98th HAG. It was then sent for rest and training at Arques behind the lines, where it joined 31st HAG, the personnel transferring to 66th Brigade at Clairmarais aerodrome (converted to a rest camp) on 27 December, leaving the guns parked at Arques.

By now HAG allocations had become more fixed, and during the winter of 1917–18 they were converted into permanent RGA brigades. 66th HAG was retitled 66th Brigade on 21 December 1917 and 122nd Siege Bty remained with it until the end of the war.

122nd Siege Bty remained at rest until 15 January 1918. Next day the whole of 66th Bde began moving to the Amiens area to join III Corps with Fifth Army. It moved into the line on 31 January, with battery HQ at Roye.

=== Spring Offensive ===
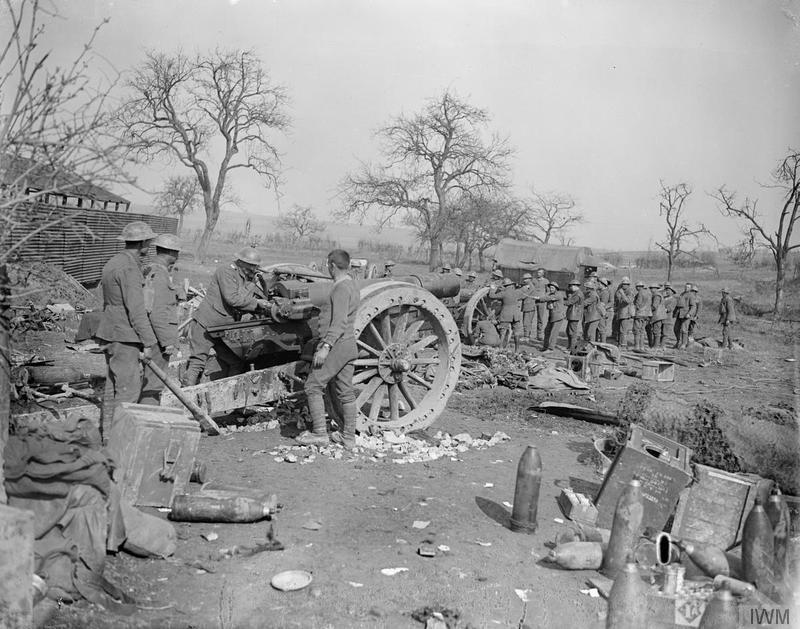
6-inch howitzers during the mobile fighting of March 1918.

When the German Spring Offensive opened on 21 March, 'the German barrage opened with a tremendous crash and practically smothered' all of 66th Bde's battery positions and cut most communications. At the time 122nd Siege Bty was deployed with two sections at Gibercourt and one in a wood at Ly-Fontaine, supporting 14th (Light) Division of Fifth Army, which was badly strung out. The battery's observation post (OP) in the front line was overrun by German infantry appearing out of the morning fog. The section at Ly-Fontaine fired off all its ammunition (about 800 rounds) and was then put out of action by its crews when they found it impossible to get the guns out of the wood. The rest of the battery fired most of its ammunition to delay the enemy crossing their bridgehead at Moÿ-de-l'Aisne but later was almost surrounded by German infantry who had broken through 14th Division's positions. The Battery Sergeant Major, with a few gunners, manned the anti-aircraft Lewis guns to defend the position while the howitzers fired over open sights. The battery transport came up and was able to drag two of the guns away under short range rifle and machine gun fire. Another gun detachment was shot down trying to turn their gun around. The battery, with its two remaining howitzers, was back in action that night at Flavy-le-Martel and immediately received one new gun from the ordnance park.

The BEF now began its 'Great Retreat'. 122nd Siege Bty went back to Cugny, where the inhabitants had to be evacuated. On 23 March, out of touch with 66th Bde HQ, the battery 'thought shooting was more useful than marching', so it engaged the Germans advancing on the village. Later, when the Germans had finally captured the village after an epic defence by the 2nd Royal Irish Rifles and 12th King's (Liverpool) Regiment, the battery shelled it until ammunition ran short. On 25 March the battery was ordered back to Lassigny, from where it fired until 31 March before being withdrawn south of Amiens.

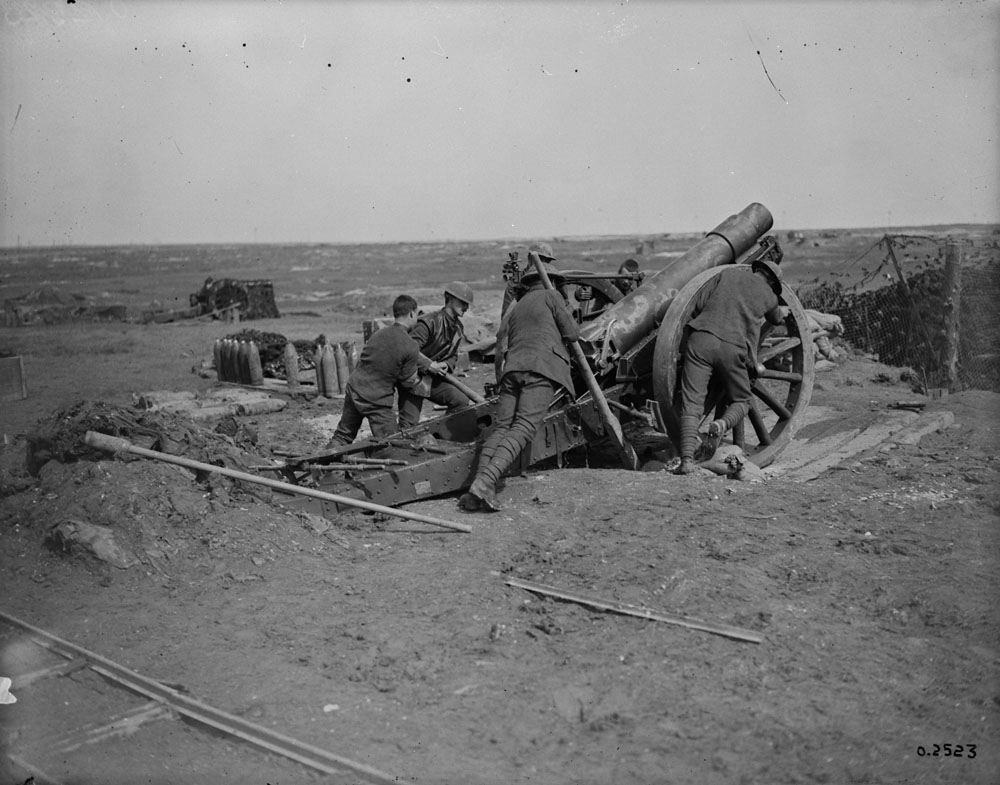
Crew positioning a 6-inch 26 cwt howitzer in February 1918.

=== Hundred Days Offensive ===
Here 66th Bde re-assembled and was re-equipped; it was ready for action again on 19 April under VI Corps and spent the next three months exchanging fire with hostile batteries and engaging in HF tasks for VI Corps and 2nd Canadian Division. In late August, with the Allied Hundred Days Offensive under way, 66th Bde was transferred to XVII Corps and moved up to Arras to support Third Army's attacks at the Battles of the Scarpe (26–30 August) and the Drocourt-Quéant Switch Line (2-3 September). On the morning of the D-Q attack, the heavy artillery switched from CB work to a 75-minute concentration on a narrow triangle between the D-Q and Hindenburg Lines, allowing 2/4th South Lancashire Regiment and 1st Royal Munster Fusiliers to advance, each on a single-company front, along the length of both defence lines.

From 23 September 122nd Siege Bty was firing to cut barbed wire for the Battle of the Canal du Nord, after which it moved up to forward positions close to the canal, where it received considerable hostile fire. Next it supported the capture of Niergnies near Cambrai on 8 October. During the Battle of the Selle on 20 October the battery was supporting the attack on the high ground east of Haussy when a single high-velocity shell killed six men instantly and wounded another 16, one of whom died. At the Battle of the Sambre on 4 November 66th Bde was at Vendegies-sur-Écaillon, supporting XVII Corps' successful attack and then XXII Corps' movement to outflank Valenciennes. Third Army's next setpiece attack was cancelled when the Germans retreated. The brigade had reached Jenlain by the time of the Armistice.

== Disbandment ==
66th Brigade was billeted at Terramesnil during the winter of 1918–19. 122nd Siege Battery was disbanded in 1919.

The Commonwealth War Graves Commission lists 37 members of the battery died on service, seven from the fighting in March 1918 and seven who died on 20 October 1918. (There may be other battery members who were recorded simply as 'RGA').
