= 134th Siege Battery, Royal Garrison Artillery =

134th Siege Battery, RGA
- Cap Badge of the Royal Regiment of Artillery
- Active: 3 May 1916–30 June 1919
- Country: United Kingdom
- Branch: British Army
- Role: Siege Artillery
- Part of: Royal Garrison Artillery
- Garrison/HQ: Dover
- Engagements: Salonika; Palestine

134th Siege Battery was a heavy howitzer unit of Britain's Royal Garrison Artillery (RGA) raised during World War I. It saw active service at Salonika and in Palestine.

== Mobilisation ==
On the outbreak of war in August 1914, units of the part-time Territorial Force (TF) were invited to volunteer for Overseas Service and the majority of the Kent and Sussex Royal Garrison Artillery did so. These 'defended ports units', which until 1910 had been a single unit, had mobilised as part of Nos 10 and 13 Coastal Fire Commands, responsible for the defence of South East England from the Medway to Newhaven. Although the TF defended ports units never served overseas, they were soon supplying trained gunners to RGA heavy and siege batteries serving in the field and providing cadres to form complete new units.

134th Siege Battery, RGA, was formed at Dover on 3 May 1916 with a nucleus of Territorials drawn from the Kent and Sussex RGA units. The battery was equipped with four modern 6-inch 26 cwt howitzers and was sent to the Macedonian front, arriving at Salonika on 20 August 1916.

== Macedonia ==
The British Salonika Army (BSF) had been sent to Macedonia in October 1915 but it was desperately short of heavy artillery, and 134th Siege Bty was one of five 6-inch howitzer batteries sent out as reinforcements in the summer of 1916, where they joined 37th Heavy Artillery Group (HAG), a headquarters transferred from the Western Front. Prior to the battery's arrival, 766 Company, Army Service Corps (ASC), had been formed at Salonika on 13 July 1916, as its Siege Park Motor Transport (MT).

When 134th Siege Bty reached the front on 4 September, 37th HAG was supporting XII Corps. The BSF had just redeployed and began a period of putting pressure on the enemy with raids and larger operations. From 6 September, XII Corps' artillery began a slow bombardment of the Macukovo Salient on the left bank of the River Vardar, rising to a systematic bombardment on 10 September. On 13 September the 6-inch howitzers fired all day, until 02.00 next morning; as soon as the artillery lifted off the objectives, the infantry of 65th Brigade stormed the positions known as the 'Piton des Mitrailleuses' and the 'Dorsale' north of Macukovo. However, having made a demonstration, these exposed positions were abandoned at dusk. Infantry casualties had been heavy in this Action at Macukovo, and sickness was rife, so for a long time to come XII Corps maintained the pressure with artillery bombardments and small raids.

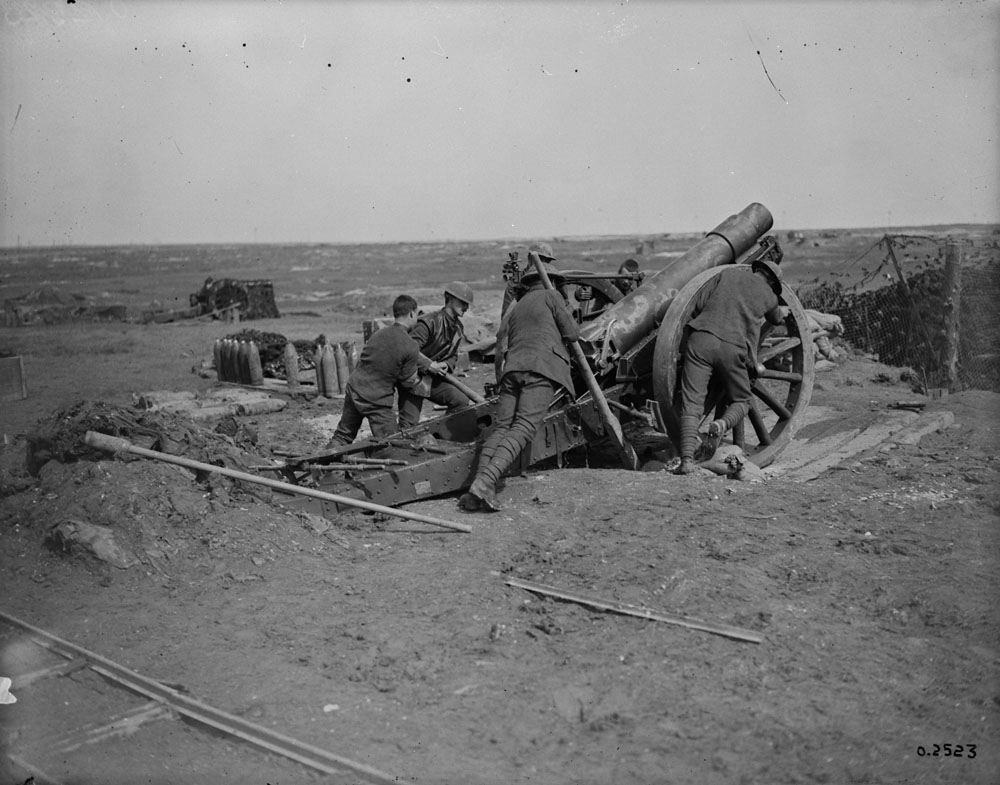
Crew positioning a 6-inch 26 cwt howitzer.

37th HAG with 134th Siege Bty and two other 6-inch howitzer batteries was then switched to XVI Corps along the River Struma, which was ordered to attack to prevent Bulgarian troops being sent elsewhere. The howitzers were dug in on the lower slopes of the foothills west of Orlyak. 81st Brigade crossed the river during the foggy night of 29/30 September and the bombardment began at 05.45, with the heavies firing on enemy-held trenches, dugouts, and buildings. 81st Brigade seized Karajakoi Bala, but an attempt to push on to Karajakoi Zir was foiled by enfilade firefrom a flanking trench. The infantry prepared to renew the attack next day while some of the 6-inch howitzers tried to hit the flanking trench. The second village was captured and the troops dug in to fend off counter-attacks. On 3 October the narrow salient that had been captured was widened by the seizure of Yenikoi. Armoured car and cavalry patrols pushed beyond the villages discovered that the Bulgarians had fallen back a long way.

After the Struma bridgehead had been consolidated, XII Corps failed in an attempt to move on and capture Bairakli Jum'a. 134th Siege Bty and another 6-inch howitzer battery allocated to 28th Division for a better-prepared attack on 31 October. Firing across the Struma, the howitzers were registered on their targets as soon the mist cleared at 07.00, and the bombardment began 15 minuted later. The attack was carried out with great speed, and overran the Bulgarians who were shaken by the bombardment. The whole front was shaken loose, and the Bulgarians were threatened by a general advance, but the onset of winter weather reduced the advance to a series of demonstrations.

In March 1917 the BSF began preparations for a spring offensive. 37th HAG was transferred back to XII Corps, 134th Siege Bty arriving on 6 March and coming directly under XII Corps Heavy Artillery until 37th HAG HQ arrived on15 March. The Second Battle of Doiran began with a night attack on 24/25 April after three days' bombardment. Ammunition was in short supply – only 150 rounds per 6-inch howitzer was available – and the Bulgarian positions were formidable. 26th Division's attack was a complete and costly failure, that of 22nd Division was more successful because the attacking infantry had deployed beyond the enemy's defensive barrage. A further attack was made at Doiran on 8 May, but despite bitter fighting around the Petite Couronne the attack was a failure. There followed a summer of stalemate on the Macedonian Front. 134th Siege Bty transferred to 75th HAG on 25 May, then to XII Corps Right Heavy Group on 3 July and rejoined 37th HAG on 31 July, but there were no major operations.

In July the War Office decided to move troops from the BSF to reinforce the Egyptian Expeditionary Force (EEF), whose invasion of Palestine had stalled at Gaza. The BSF was ordered to send two 6-inch howitzer batteries, and 134th Siege Bty was one of those chosen. It was moved back to the base at Salonika on 15 August and embarked for Egypt on 29 August 1917. Left behind with the BSF, 766 Co ASC became a GHQ Troops Supply Company.

== Palestine ==
134th Siege Bty arrived in Egypt on 5 September 1917 and joined 100th HAG with the newly-formed XXI Corps at the end of the month. Prior to the battery's arrival, 988 Company, ASC, had been formed at Ismailia on 29 August 1917 as its Ammunition Column MT.

The EEF was preparing for a renewed attack (the Third Battle of Gaza), with XXI Corps on the left (coastal) flank facing Gaza itself. Its heavy guns were divided into a right and left counter-battery (CB) group and a bombardment group, with 134th Siege Bty loaned to 95th HAG under this organisation. As well as their primary roles, all three artillery groups were also available to concentrate CB fire on Turkish guns, with 300 rounds of 6-inch howitzer ammunition allocated to each located battery. The bombardment began on 27 October while operations were going on elsewhere, then the attack on Gaza began with a preliminary attack at 23.10 on 1 November after a 10-minute intense bombardment of 'Umbrella Hill'. The second phase began at 03.00 on 2 November and made good progress. At 08.57 the whole of the corps heavy artillery began a defensive barrage (pre-registered by means of aircraft observation) that scattered an attempted Turkish counter-attack. Although the Turkish artillery responded strongly, it was all withdrawn before the end of the day in response to British CB fire and the advancing infantry. By the end of the day the British troops had taken almost all their objectives and had succeeded in pinning the enemy troops and causing heavy casualties. The corps heavy artillery brought up another 1000 rounds per gun, but the Turks evacuated Gaza before the follow-up attack could be launched on 7 November as the rest of the EEF broke through further east.

The leading troops of XXI Corps then began advancing north of Gaza as the EEF moved on Jerusalem. The corps was hampered by shortage of transport, and artillery ammunition had to be brought up by ship and landed on the beach. Although some heavy artillery batteries were got up for the capture of Junction Station on 14 November, 134th Siege Bty was not among them. XII Corps began its advance into the Judean Hills on 19 November and took Nebi Samwil on 21 November, though even the light field gun batteries found movement almost impossible in the hills in winter weather. However, 100th HAG had caught up for the launch of the Battle of Jaffa on 11 December. The rest of the corps heavy artillery and a sound-ranging section arrived by 13 December and the whole supported the passage of the Nahr el 'Auja on the night of 20/21 December. The batteries were brought up into concealed positions and 100th HAG began CB fire on the morning of 20 December. The bold attack was a complete success.

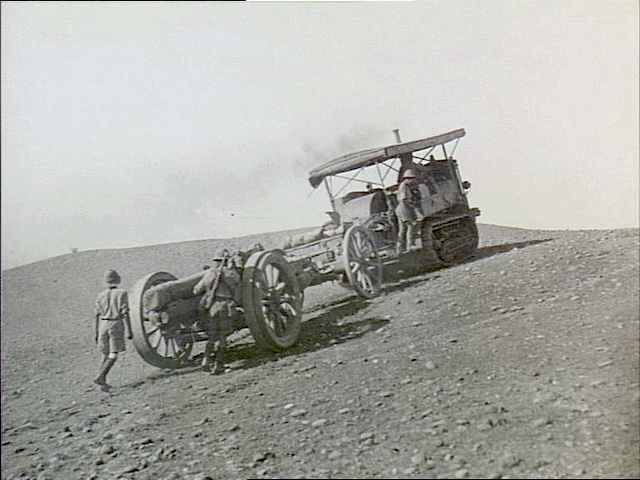
Holt 75 tractor towing a 6-inch howitzer in the Middle East, 1918.

Having captured Jerusalem, the EEF spent the winter defending it against Turkish counter-attacks. The campaign restarted in March 1918 with the Battle of Tell 'Asur. XXI Corps was in support, and had the advantage of good positions for its heavy artillery, which could support the advance with enfilade fire. One section of 134th Siege Bty was equipped with Holt 75 caterpillar tractors and assigned to move up in direct support of 75th Division; the other section was in the Bombardment Group under 95th HAG. On 7 March, 75th Division advanced its right flank to gain routes for the artillery and supplies, and the section of 134th Siege Bty moved up to Qibye behind it. During the attack on 12 March this section engaged strongpoints out of reach of the Bombardment Group. Well supported by the artillery, the infantry had a relatively easy task and their casualties were light. On 9–11 April a section of 134th Siege Bty supported 75th Division once more in a much tougher fight at Berukin against German troops.

After a pause during the summer, the EEF began a new offensive (the Battle of Megiddo) in September 1918. The first phase was an attack by XXI Corps with the bulk of the heavy artillery to break through the Turkish positions in the Plain of Sharon and swing eastwards, after which the Desert Mounted Corps (DMC) pass through to begin the exploitation. The relatively mobile 6-inch howitzers would be ready to move up in support after the breakthrough. The Battle of Sharon opened at 04.30 on 19 September with a 15-minute bombardment, the heaviest of the whole Palestine campaign, simultaneous with the infantry attack. The heavy artillery was mainly tasked with CB fire (directed by prior air reconnaissance, sound-ranging and patrolling) with a few individual guns and howitzers shelling Turkish headquarters and telephone exchanges out of range of the field guns. The heavies would then be available to fire on any strongpoints holding up the advance. The Turkish artillery replied promptly at Zero hour, but was soon suppressed by the intensity and accuracy of the CB fire. By the end of the day the whole Turkish defence system had been penetrated and the DMC began the pursuit.

XXI Corps was left behind during the pursuit. The infantry were employed in improving the roads. Eventually a road suitable for 60-pounder heavy guns was opened for XXI Corps to advance up the coast to Beirut, but the howitzers had to be left behind as the campaign reached its climax. 134th Siege Bty and 988 Co, ASC, transferred to 97th Bde, RGA, on 25 October 1918, then to Corps Troops, and finally to Line of Communication Troops as the HQs moved forwards. Hostilities in Palestine ended on 31 October with the Armistice of Mudros.

134th Siege Battery was disbanded at Ismailia on 30 June 1919.
