= Hougham Without =

Civil parish in Kent, England

Coordinates: 51.125°N 1.23°E

Hougham
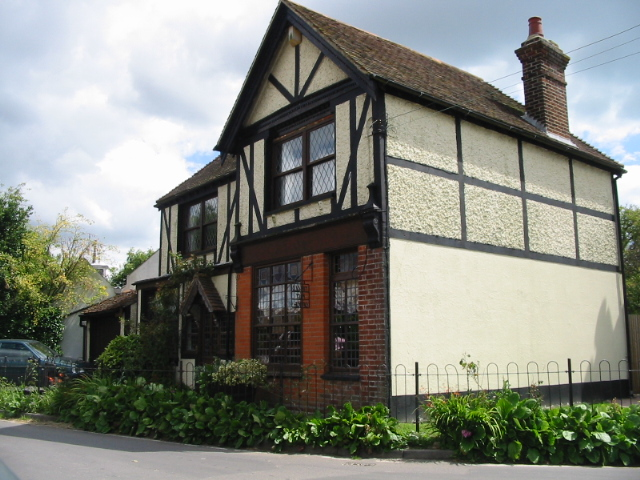
- The Old Post Office

- Location within Kent
- Population: 463 (2011)
- District: Dover
- Shire county: Kent
- Region: South East
- Country: England
- Sovereign state: United Kingdom
- Post town: Dover
- Postcode district: CT15
- Police: Kent
- Fire: Kent
- Ambulance: South East Coast

Hougham Without is a civil parish between Dover and Folkestone, in the Dover district, in the county of Kent, England. The main settlements are the villages of Church Hougham and West Hougham, collectively known simply as "Hougham". Great Hougham Court Farm is located to the south of the two villages, near the Dover transmitting station. The Channel Tunnel runs underground just south of West Hougham and directly under both Church Hougham and the Farm. In 2011 the parish had a population of 463.

== See also ==
- Listed buildings in Hougham Without
- Hougham Battery
- Lydden Spout Battery
- St. Radegund's Abbey
- Samphire Hoe
- Alkham Valley
