= Listed buildings in Hougham Without =

Historic structures in Kent, England

Hougham Without is a village and civil parish in the Dover District of Kent, England. It contains 14 listed buildings that are recorded in the National Heritage List for England. Of these one is grade I, three are grade II* and ten are grade II.

This list is based on the information retrieved online from Historic England.

== Key ==
Grade	Criteria
I	Buildings that are of exceptional interest
II*	Particularly important buildings of more than special interest
II	Buildings that are of special interest

== Listing ==
Name	Grade	Location	Type	Completed (Note: The date given is the date used by Historic England as significant for the initial building or that of an important part in the structure's description.)	Date designated	Grid ref. (Note: The grid reference is based on the British national grid reference system, sometimes known as OSGB36, used by the Ordnance Survey.) Geo-coordinates	Notes	Entry number (Note: The "List Entry Number" is a unique number assigned to each listed building and scheduled monument by Historic England.)	Image	Wikidata
Stone Barn at St Radegund's Abbey Farm, About 65 Metres South of Well House	II*	About 65 Metres South Of Well House, Abbey Road	barn		28 May 1987	TR2754841862; 51°07′51″N 1°15′03″E		1356562	Stone Barn at St Radegund's Abbey Farm, About 65 Metres South of Well House More images	Q17557883
Ruins of St Radegund's Abbey (the Uninhabited Portions)	II*	Abbey Road			22 August 1962	TR2753741993; 51°07′55″N 1°15′03″E		1070023	Upload Photo	Q7591573
St Radegund's Abbey Farmhouse and Outhouse	II*	Abbey Road	farmhouse		17 August 1952	TR2753841955; 51°07′54″N 1°15′03″E		1068889	St Radegund's Abbey Farmhouse and Outhouse More images	Q17557473
Well House About 20 Metres South of St Radegund's Abbey Farmhouse	II	Abbey Road	building		6 February 1979	TR2754641925; 51°07′53″N 1°15′03″E		1067767	Well House About 20 Metres South of St Radegund's Abbey Farmhouse More images	Q26320565
Church House	II	Church Lane			6 February 1979	TR2784340032; 51°06′51″N 1°15′14″E		1363383	Upload Photo	Q26645211
Church of St Lawrence	I	Church Lane	church building		22 August 1962	TR2782739972; 51°06′49″N 1°15′13″E		1070024	Church of St Lawrence More images	Q17529710
Homestead	II	Church Lane			6 February 1979	TR2792340024; 51°06′51″N 1°15′18″E		1067707	Upload Photo	Q26320506
Black Swan Farmhouse	II	Crook's Court Lane			22 August 1962	TR2653440024; 51°06′53″N 1°14′07″E		1070025	Upload Photo	Q26323536
Rose Hill Farmhouse	II	Mill Lane			6 February 1979	TR2662240099; 51°06′55″N 1°14′12″E		1067713	Upload Photo	Q26320512
Stone Marking the Site of St Mary's Church the Polton Stone	II	Polton			28 May 1987	TR2704641258; 51°07′32″N 1°14′36″E		1070026	Upload Photo	Q26323538
Barn About 10 Metres South of Well House, St Radegund's Abbey	II	St Radegund's Abbey, Abbey Road	barn		6 February 1979	TR2754641901; 51°07′52″N 1°15′03″E		1363382	Barn About 10 Metres South of Well House, St Radegund's Abbey More images	Q26645210
Elms Farmhouse	II	Stonyway Lane			29 March 1973	TR2835340802; 51°07′15″N 1°15′42″E		1067723	Upload Photo	Q26320521
Coxhill House	II	The Street			6 February 1979	TR2668340337; 51°07′03″N 1°14′15″E		1363384	Upload Photo	Q26645212

== See also ==
- Grade I listed buildings in Kent
- Grade II* listed buildings in Kent

== Sources ==
- Newman, John (2013) [1969], Kent: North-East and East, The Buildings of England, New Haven and London: Yale University Press, ISBN 978-0-300-18506-5
