= Sussex Royal Garrison Artillery =

Sussex Royal Garrison Artillery Sussex Heavy Brigade, RA
- Cap Badge of the Royal Regiment of Artillery
- Active: 1910–1 October 1932
- Country: United Kingdom
- Branch: Territorial Force
- Role: Coast Artillery
- Part of: Royal Garrison Artillery
- Garrison/HQ: Brighton
- Engagements: World War I

The Sussex Royal Garrison Artillery and its successors were part-time coast defence units of the British Army from 1910 to 1932. Although the unit saw no active service, it supplied trained gunners to siege batteries engaged on the Western Front during World War I.

== Origin ==
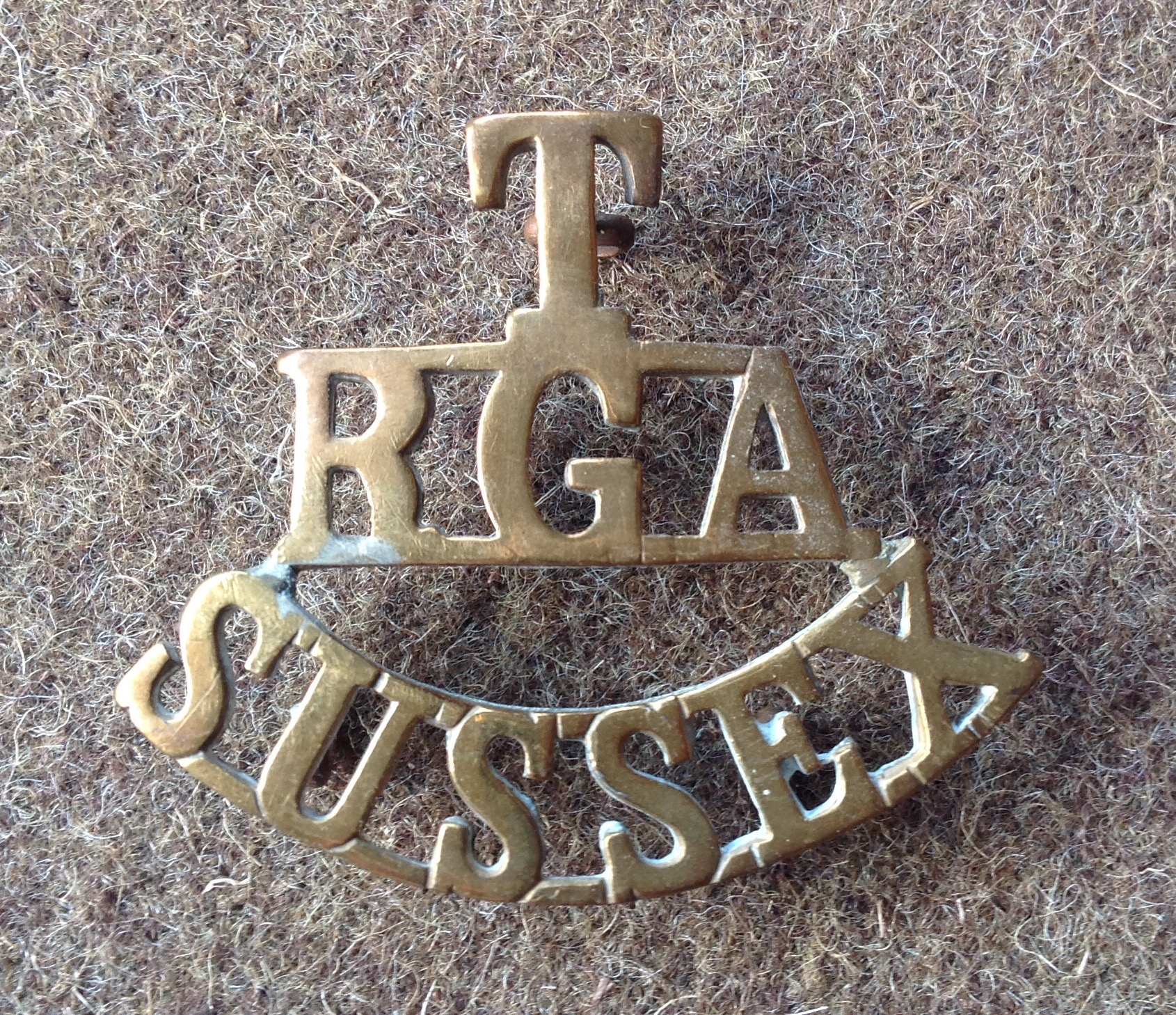
Brass shoulder title worn by the Sussex RGA 1910–24.

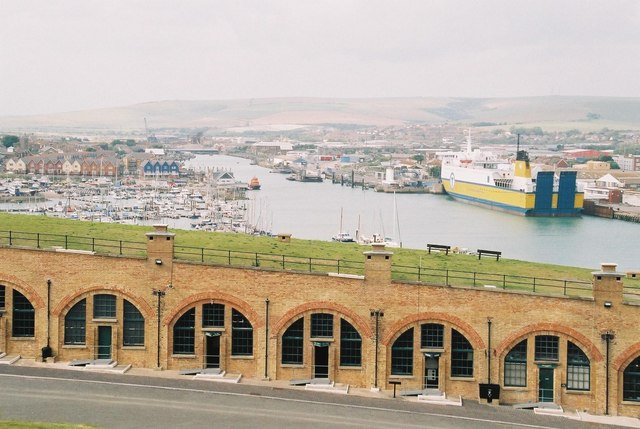
Newhaven Fort: the casemates and the eastern rampart overlooking the harbour.

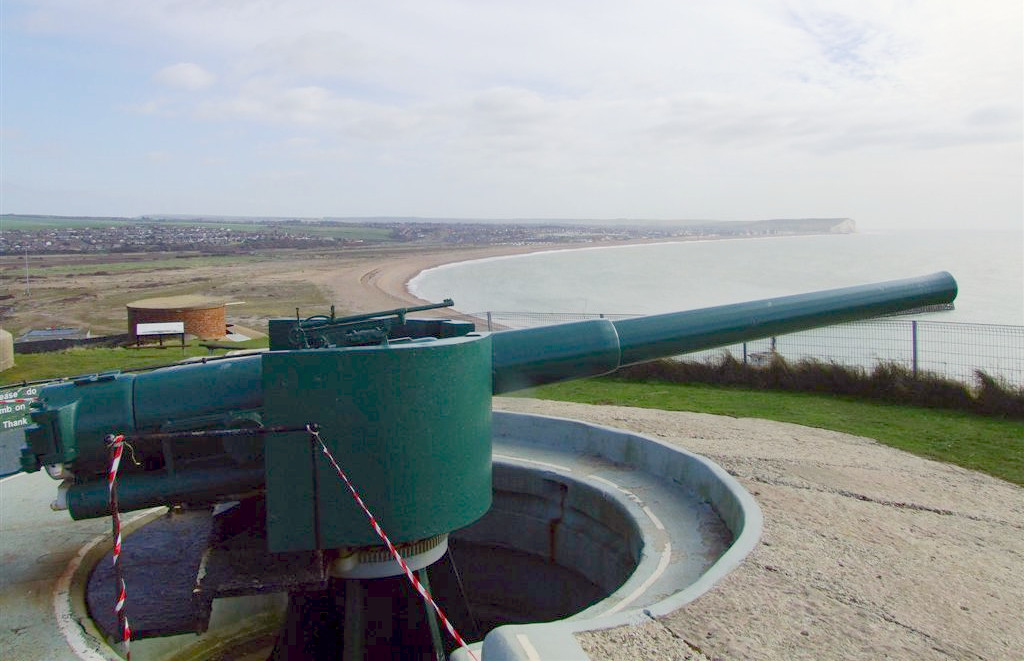
Mk VII 6-inch gun in typical coast defence emplacement, preserved at Newhaven Fort.

When the Territorial Force (TF) was created from the old Volunteer Force under the Haldane Reforms of 1908, the Kent and Sussex Royal Garrison Artillery was included as a new defended ports unit of the Royal Garrison Artillery (RGA). It was formed from companies drawn from the previous 1st Kent and 1st Sussex RGA (Volunteers) and its headquarters (HQ) was at Chatham, Kent. However, two years later, the two Sussex companies were split off to form a separate Sussex Royal Garrison Artillery with the following organisation:

- HQ at 117 Gloucester Road, Brighton
- No 1 Company at Brighton
- No 2 Company at Watergate Lane, Lewes

The unit was responsible for the defended port of Newhaven in South Eastern Coast Defences, which was guarded by two 6-inch Mk VII guns mounted at Newhaven Fort.

== World War I ==
=== Mobilisation ===
When World War I broke out on 4 August 1914, the TF coastal units mobilised and manned their defences. On 31 August 1914, the War Office (WO) authorised the formation of Reserve or 2nd Line units for each existing TF unit; each was prefixed '2/' to distinguish it from the 1st Line ('1/'). Initially these were formed from men who had not volunteered for overseas service, together with the recruits who were flooding in.

By October 1914, the campaign on the Western Front was bogging down into Trench warfare and there was an urgent need for batteries of siege artillery to be sent to France. The WO decided that the TF coastal gunners were well enough trained to take over many of the duties in the coastal defences, releasing Regular RGA gunners for service in the field. Soon, the TF RGA companies that had volunteered for overseas service were also supplying trained gunners to RGA units serving overseas. Although complete defended ports units never went overseas, they did provide cadres to form units from New Army ('Kitchener's Army') volunteers for front line service. The Sussex RGA supplied cadres for 69th and 122nd Siege Btys in 1915–16 (see below), and 134th Siege Bty, formed at Dover in 1916, is known to have had a nucleus of men from the Kent and Sussex RGA units. This may also have been the case for some of the numerous other siege batteries formed at Dover during the war.

This process meant a continual drain on the manpower of the defended ports units and, in April 1917, the coastal defence companies of the RGA (TF) were reorganised. By this stage of the war, the Dover and Newhaven Defences of Eastern Command consisted of 1/1, 1/2, 2/1 and 2/2 Companies of the Sussex RGA and 1/3 and 2/3 Companies of the Kent RGA (the remainder of the Kent companies being in the Thames and Medway defences). These six companies were reduced to just two (Nos 1 and 2 Companies, Sussex RGA), given a slightly higher establishment (five officers and 100 other ranks (ORs)), and the 1st and 2nd Line distinction was abolished. At the end of the war, the two companies were in No 10 (Kent & Sussex) Fire Control at Newhaven.

The TF was demobilised in 1919 after the Armistice with Germany and the Sussex RGA entered suspended animation.

=== 69th Siege Battery ===
A company from the Sussex RGA provided half the personnel for 69th Siege Battery, RGA when it was formed on 9 October 1915, the remainder being New Army volunteers. Major A.J. Martineau of the Sussex RGA served as second-in-command. The battery landed in France on 1 April 1916 equipped with four 9.2-inch howitzers and joined 27th Heavy Artillery Group (HAG) supporting III Corps in Fourth Army.

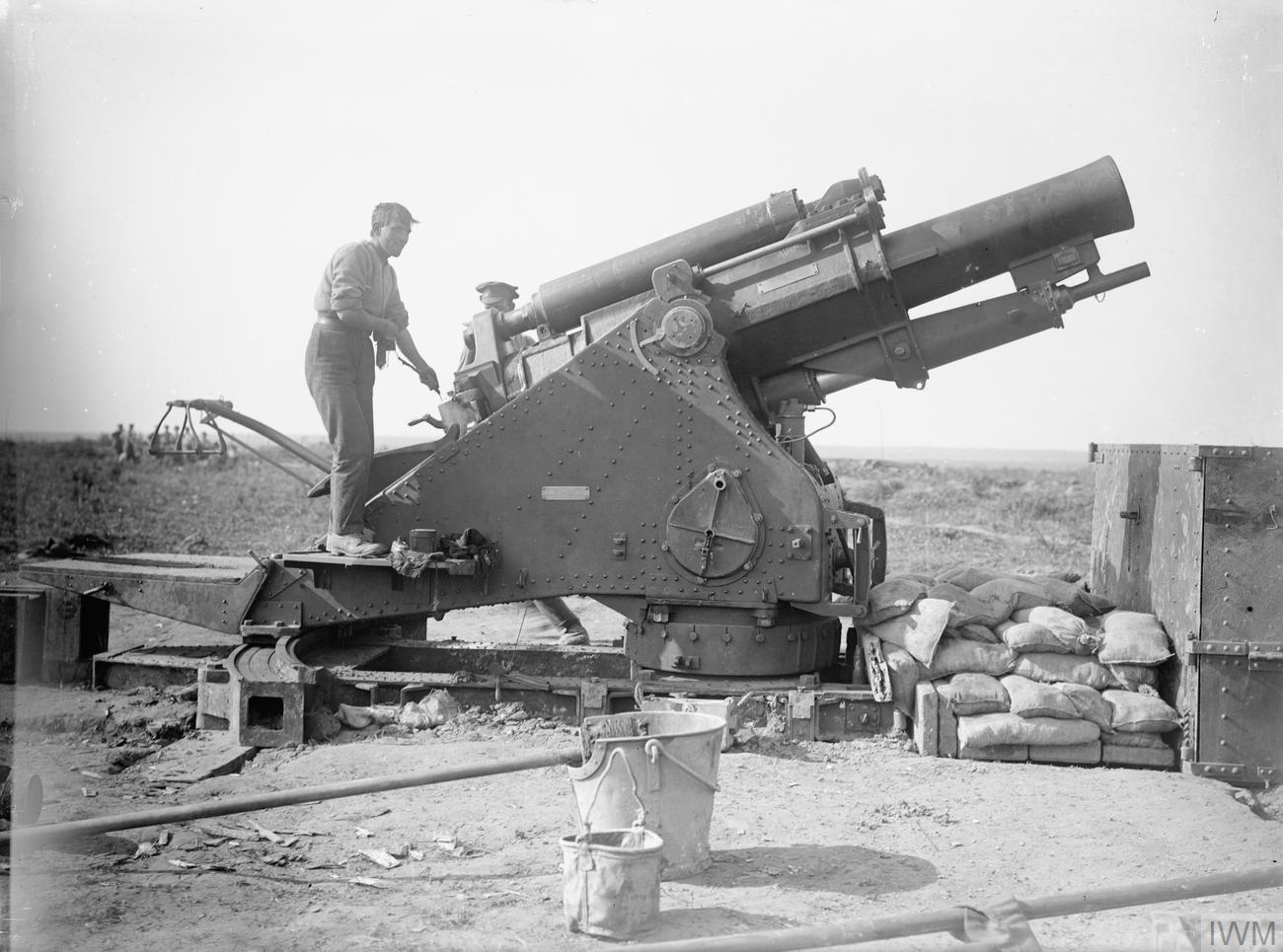
9.2-inch howitzer in action on the Somme, 1916.

==== Somme ====
Fourth Army was preparing for that year's 'Big Push', the Battle of the Somme, with III Corps facing the German redoubts in front of Ovillers. The final bombardment began at 06.25 on Z Day (1 July). However, the artillery had failed to knock out many of the machine gun positions, and as soon as the attackers went 'over the top' they began to take heavy casualties. 8th Division attacking up the Ovillers spur gained only a few footholds in the opposing lines, and it was impossible to renew the attack in the afternoon. The battery continued to support Fourth Army while the Somme offensive continued into the autumn.

==== 1917 ====
At this period, RGA batteries were regularly switched from one HAG to another. In March 1917, 69th Siege Bty moved north for Third Army's Battle of Arras on 9 April. Before and during the attack, it carried out counter-battery (CB) tasks and fired on selected roads in support of XVII Corps. The corps' attack was largely successful, and large numbers of German prisoners were taken, demoralised by the bombardment. The battery supported the subsequent stages of the offensive, including the attacks on Oppy Wood.

The battery then joined Second Army, as part of the artillery build-up for the Battle of Messines. The bombardment continued until the assault went in on 7 June, following the explosion of huge mines. The results of the limited attack were spectacular.

69th Siege Bty was next sent to rejoin Fourth Army, which had assembled round Nieuport to carry out a planned attack along the Belgian coast in support of the Flanders Offensive. British preparations were disrupted by a German spoiling attack and there was no breakthrough at Ypres so Fourth Army's operation was cancelled. Over the following weeks the British batteries exchanged CB fire with their German opposite numbers, with numerous casualties to gunners and guns. This continued until 69th Siege Bty was pulled out in November.

==== Spring Offensive ====
The battery returned to the Arras sector where it joined 83rd HAG under First Army. By now, HAG allocations were becoming more fixed, and in early 1918 they were converted into permanent RGA brigades. For the rest of the war the battery was part of 83rd (Mixed) Bde, RGA. 69th Siege Bty was made up to a strength of six guns when a section from 504th Siege Bty arrived from England and joined on 16 March 1918.

On 28 March, the German Spring Offensive extended to First Army's front (the Third Battle of Arras), beginning with a massive bombardment. 69th Siege Bty was subjected to a barrage of high explosive (HE) and gas shells and suffered heavy casualties, including the officer commanding, Maj Cyril Scholefield, who was killed. However, the German attacks were devastated by the British field and heavy artillery and although the British infantry were forced out of their forward positions there was no breakthrough, and the battle was over by nightfall.

==== Hundred Days Offensive ====
The guns resumed harassing fire (HF) against the Germans in support of Canadian Corps, which had taken over the line, and continued through the spring and early summer until Canadian Corps, now under Fourth Army, participated in the Battle of Amiens on 8 August. By mid-morning, the enemy had been driven back out of range of the heavy guns. 83rd Brigade was left behind, and it was not until 13 August that 69th Siege Bty caught up for the Canadians' follow-up attack on 15 August. 83rd Brigade also manned some captured German heavy guns, which it fired in support of the attack. The Allied Hundred Days Offensive was now well under way.

During the Battle of Albert (23 August), 83rd Bde's batteries fired in support of the French XXXI Corps. By early September, hostile shelling was well below normal levels, and as the enemy pulled back out of range 83rd Bde's batteries were placed in GHQ Reserve. The guns then moved up to support the successful surprise attack of the Battle of Épehy (18 September), when the massed artillery crushed a German counter-attack. Fourth Army had now closed up to the Hindenburg Line. On 29 September, 83rd Bde supported 46th (North Midland) Division's attack on the St Quentin Canal: 69th Siege Bty's role was to breach the canal embankment in an attempt to drain the water. 46th (NM) Division swarmed over the canal across captured bridges and dams, using lifebelts and planks, and took its final objectives before nightfall.

83rd Brigade now moved its lighter howitzers across the canal to support the pursuit, leaving 69th Siege Bty's heavy 9.2's behind. It was not until the night of 12/13 October that the battery caught up to support Fourth Army's next setpiece operation, the Battle of the Selle. The attack on 17 October quickly achieved its objectives; 83rd Bde's fire then helped to break up a German counter-attack before a fresh British attack made further progress in the afternoon. Next morning, the brigade put down heavy barrages in front of a renewed attack, after which the Germans retired across the Sambre–Oise Canal and destroyed the bridges behind them.

On 4 November, the battery supported 1st Division's attack across the Sambre–Oise Canal. Bridgeheads over the canal were established and the infantry pushed on beyond. Next day the German artillery could be seen pulling out and retreating. Again, 69th Siege Bty's heavy howitzers had to be left behind and it was still in reserve when the Armistice came into force on 11 November.

69th Siege Battery was disbanded on 26 October 1919.

=== 122nd Siege Battery ===
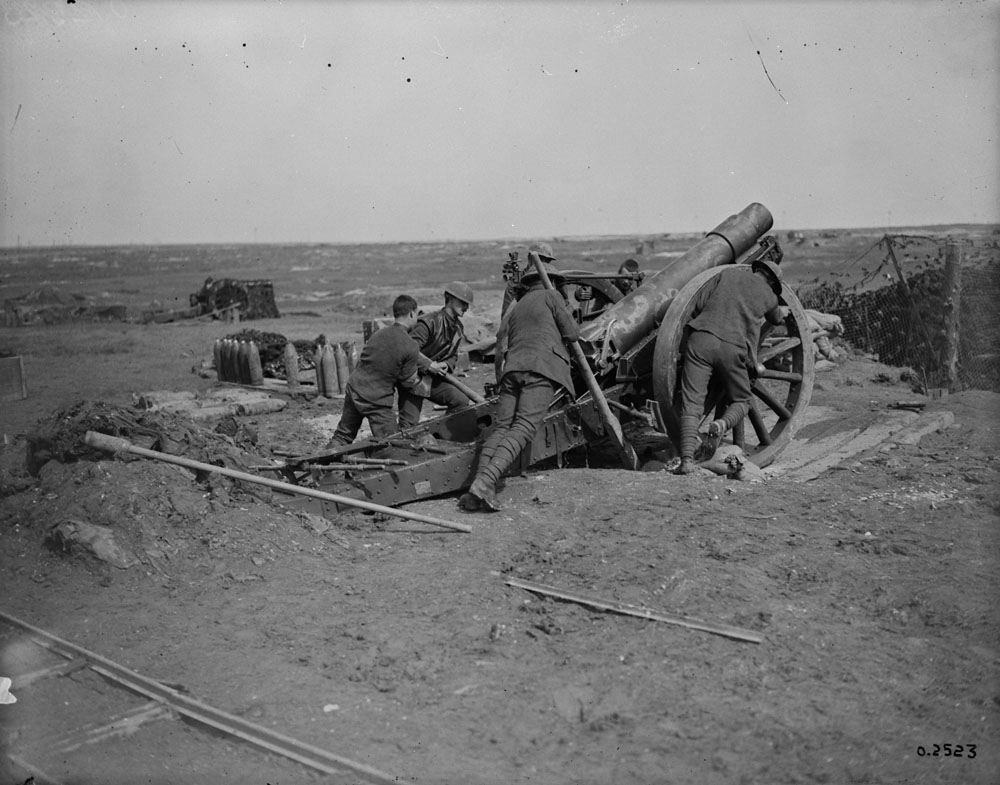
Crew positioning a 6-inch howitzer in 1918.

A cadre of three officers and 78 ORs (the equivalent of a company) of the Sussex RGA was assigned to 122nd Siege Battery, RGA, when it was formed at Dover on 22 March 1916. W.F.H. Grinsted, who had been a lieutenant in No 1 Co Sussex RGA on the outbreak of war and promoted to captain on 4 November 1914, was seconded for duty with the Regular RGA from 28 April 1916 and as an Acting Major was the battery's commander in 1917–18. The battery was equipped with four 6-inch howitzers and went out to the Western Front on 18 July 1916, when it joined 8th HAG with Third Army near Arras.

==== Somme ====
The Arras sector was relatively quiet during the summer with the emphasis being on the Somme battle further south. In mid-September, 8 HAG was ordered to move south with its batteries to join VII Corps where it was engaged in CB tasks supporting the adjacent Reserve Army attacking on the Somme. On 16 October 122nd Siege Bty transferred to Reserve Army (renamed Fifth Army) for CB work and bombardments in the Battle of the Ancre Heights. Fifth Army continued attacking during November (the Battle of the Ancre) before the Somme offensive died out.

==== 1917 ====
In January 1917, 122nd Siege Bty returned to Third Army. It supported the attack on Arras on 9 April, moving forward into captured positions. It participated in bombardments during the continuing offensive, culminating in the capture of Rœux on 13 May.

After a series of rapid changes in HAG assignment, the battery joined 19th HAG on the Belgian coast with Fourth Army in July. It was made up to a strength of six howitzers when a section of the newly-arrived 382nd Siege Bty joined on 29–30 July 1917. As with 69th Siege Bty, 122nd suffered damage and casualties from hostile CB fire while in these positions. On 1 December 1917, the battery was ordered south and joined 66th Bde, RGA. It remained with this brigade until the end of the war.

==== Spring Offensive ====
In March 1918, 66th Bde was supporting 14th (Light) Division of Fifth Army, which was badly strung out. When the Spring Offensive opened on 21 March, 'the German barrage opened with a tremendous crash and practically smothered' all of 66th Bde's battery positions, cutting most communications. At the time 122nd Siege Bty was deployed with two sections at Gibercourt and one in a wood at Ly-Fontaine. The battery's observation post (OP) in the front line was overrun by German infantry appearing out of the morning fog. The section at Ly-Fontaine fired off all its ammunition and was then put out of action by its crews when they found it impossible to get the howitzers out of the wood. The rest of the battery fired most to delay the enemy crossing their bridgehead at Moÿ-de-l'Aisne but later was almost surrounded by German infantry who had broken through 14th Division's positions. The Battery Sergeant Major, with a few gunners, manned the anti-aircraft Lewis guns to defend the position while the howitzers fired over open sights. The battery transport was able to drag two of the guns away under short range rifle and machine gun fire. Another gun detachment was shot down trying to turn their gun around. The battery, with its two remaining howitzers, was back in action that night at Flavy-le-Martel.

The BEF now began its 'Great Retreat'. 122nd Siege Bty went back to Cugny, where the inhabitants had to be evacuated. On 23 March, out of touch with 66th Bde HQ, the battery 'thought shooting was more useful than marching', so it engaged the Germans advancing on the village, and later shelled the village after its capture, until ammunition ran short. On 25 March, the battery was ordered back to Lassigny, from where it remained in action until 31 March before being withdrawn south of Amiens.

==== Hundred Days Offensive ====
Here, 66th Bde re-assembled and was re-equipped; it was ready for action again on 19 April under VI Corps and spent the next three months exchanging fire with hostile batteries and engaging in HF tasks. In late August, with the Allied Hundred Days Offensive under way, 66th Bde moved up to Arras to support Third Army's attacks at the Scarpe and the Drocourt-Quéant Switch Line. From 23 September, 122nd Siege Bty was firing to cut barbed wire for the Battle of the Canal du Nord, after which it moved to forward positions close to the canal, where it received considerable hostile fire. Next, it supported the capture of Niergnies near Cambrai on 8 October. During the Battle of the Selle, on 20 October, the battery was supporting the attack on the high ground east of Haussy when a single high-velocity shell killed six men and wounded another 16. At the beginning of November, 66th Bde was at Vendegies-sur-Écaillon, supporting XXII Corps' movement to outflank Valenciennes. Third Army's next setpiece attack was cancelled when the Germans retreated. The brigade had reached Jenlain by the time of the Armistice.

122nd Siege Battery was disbanded in 1919.

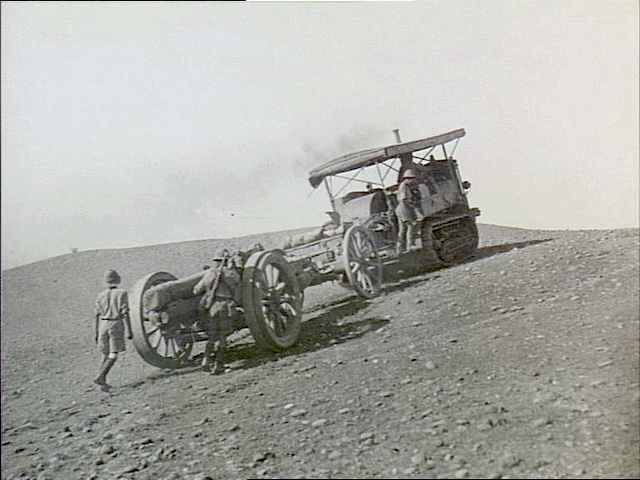
Holt 75 caterpillar tractor towing a 6-inch howitzer in the Middle East, 1918.

=== 134th Siege Battery ===
134th Siege Battery, RGA, was formed at Dover on 3 May 1916 with a nucleus of Territorials drawn from the Kent and Sussex RGA units. The battery was equipped with four 6-inch howitzers and was sent to the Macedonian front, arriving at Salonika on 20 August 1916. It served with XII Corps in the Vardar and Struma valleys. In 1917, it fought in the Second Battle of Doiran, but was then moved to the Palestine Front, where it fought with XXI Corps in the Third Battle of Gaza, the capture of Jerusalem and the victorious Battle of Megiddo.

134th Siege Battery was disbanded in 1919.

== Postwar ==
When the TF was reconstituted on 7 February 1920, the Sussex RGA was reformed from No 2 Company with HQ and one battery, based at the Drill Hall, Watergate Lane, Lewes. The TF was reorganised as the Territorial Army (TA) in 1921, when the unit was redesignated as the Sussex Coast Brigade, RGA and the battery was designated 159 Bty. Then, when the RGA was subsumed into the Royal Artillery (RA) in 1924, the unit was redesignated again as the Sussex Heavy Brigade, RA. It formed part of the coast defence troops in 44th (Home Counties) Divisional Area.

In 1926, it was decided that the coastal defences of Great Britain should be solely manned by part-time soldiers of the TA. This entailed some reorganisation of units, and the scheme reached its final form in 1932. As a result, the Sussex Heavy Brigade was reintegrated with the Kent unit on 1 October 1932 to form the Kent & Sussex Heavy Bde. The brigade HQ at Lewes was disbanded and 159 Bty transferred to the combined unit as 159 (Sussex) Heavy Bty.

== Successor units ==
Shortly after the outbreak of World War II, the Kent & Sussex Heavy Regiment (as it was now termed) was reorganised as three coast regiments (519th, 520th and 521st) of which 521st (Kent & Sussex) Coast Rgt had its HQ at Newhaven in Sussex. Postwar, this regiment was reformed on 1 January 1947 as 411 (Sussex) Coast Rgt, with its HQ at Brighton. After the coast artillery branch of the RA was abolished in 1956, the regiment became 6th (Sussex Coast Artillery) Unit Travel Control Security (Army) in the Port & Travel Control Group of the Intelligence Corps.

== Honorary Colonel ==
F. Loud, TD, who had commanded No 2 Company before World War I, and assumed command of the whole unit postwar with the rank of Brevet Lieutenant-Colonel, was appointed its Honorary Colonel on 16 August 1924.
