= 1st Kent Artillery Volunteers =

1st Kent Artillery Volunteers Kent Royal Garrison Artillery Kent & Sussex Heavy Brigade 410 (Kent) Coast Regiment
- Active: 1860–1956
- Country: United Kingdom
- Branch: Volunteer Force
- Type: Artillery Corps
- Role: Garrison Artillery; Coastal Artillery; Heavy Artillery; Anti-Aircraft Artillery
- Garrison/HQ: Gravesend (1860–1908); Fort Clarence, Rochester; Dover
- Engagements: World War I World War II

The 1st Kent Artillery Volunteers was a part-time unit of the British Army's Royal Artillery from 1860 to 1956. Primarily serving as coastal artillery defending the Port of Dover and other harbours in South-East England, the unit's successors also served in the heavy artillery role on the Western Front during World War I and as anti-aircraft artillery during the Blitz and later in the North African and Italian campaigns of World War II.

== Volunteer Force ==
Many Volunteer units were raised in Great Britain as a result of an invasion scare in 1859. These small independent units were quickly organised into larger groupings, and the 1st Administrative Brigade of Kent Artillery Volunteers was formed on 15 August 1860. It comprised the following Artillery Volunteer Corps (AVCs):

- 1st Kent AVC formed at Gravesend on 20 October 1859; a second battery formed on 5 March 1860
- 2nd Kent AVC formed at Faversham on 15 November 1859; a second battery formed on 27 August 1861
- 3rd Kent AVC formed at Folkestone on 7 November 1859 (transferred to the 1st Cinque Ports Artillery Volunteers in April 1860)
- 4th Kent AVC formed at Sheerness Dockyard on 9 January 1860 (absorbed by the 13th Kent AVC on 23 January 1867)
- 5th Kent AVC formed at Blackheath on 28 February 1860, augmented by a half battery on 25 March 1862; to two full batteries after September 1863
- 6th Kent AVC appeared in the Army List in March 1860 but was never formed
- 7th Kent AVC formed at Greenwich in March 1860 but no officers were ever gazetted and it was removed from the Army List in 1862
- 8th Kent AVC was never formed
- 9th Kent AVC formed at Plumstead as a sub-division on 13 February, increased to a battery on 15 August 1860; attached to the 10th Kent AVC June 1870. Renumbered 2nd in 1880.
- 10th Kent AVC formed at the Royal Arsenal, Woolwich on 28 February 1860. Renumbered in 1880 as 3rd Kent (Royal Arsenal)
- 11th Kent AVC formed at Sandgate as a sub-division on 25 February; increased to a battery on 2 March 1860
- 12th Kent AVC formed at Gillingham on 6 March 1860
- 13th Kent AVC formed at Sheerness Dockyard on 1 March 1860 as two batteries; took over 4th Kent AVC as its third battery on 23 January 1867
- 14th Kent AVC formed at Woolwich Dockyard on 29 March 1860; disbanded in 1870 when the dockyard closed

=== Reorganisation ===
A reorganisation in May 1880 saw the Plumstead and Woolwich units become independent, and the remaining Corps were consolidated as the 1st Kent Artillery Volunteer Corps (1st KAVC) with HQ at Gravesend and eleven batteries provided as follows:

- Nos 1 and 2 Batteries at Gravesend from 1st Kent AVC
- Nos 3 and 4 Batteries at Faversham from 2nd Kent AVC
- Nos 5 and 6 Batteries at Blackheath from 5th Kent AVC
- No 7 Battery at Sandgate from 11th Kent AVC
- No 8 Battery at Gillingham from 12th Kent AVC
- Nos 9–11 Batteries at Sheerness from 13th Kent AVC

All artillery volunteers were attached to one of the territorial divisions of the Royal Artillery (TA) in 1882 with the 1st KAVC joining the Cinque Ports Division. In 1887, the unit was redesignated the 3rd Volunteer (Kent) Brigade, Cinque Ports Division, RA, but this title only lasted until the Cinque Ports Division was disbanded in 1889, when the unit transferred to the Eastern Division and became the 1st Kent Artillery Volunteer Corps (Eastern Division, RA).

By 1892, the Kent Artillery Volunteer Corps were organised as follows:

- 1st Kent Artillery Volunteers – Headquarters at Gravesend
- 2nd Kent Artillery Volunteers – Headquarters at Plumstead
- 3rd Kent Artillery Volunteers (Royal Arsenal) – Headquarters at Woolwich

In 1889, the Artillery Volunteers became part of the Royal Garrison Artillery (RGA), and when the territorial divisions were abolished the 1st KAVC was designated 1st Kent Brigade RGA (Volunteers) from 1 January 1902.

== Territorial Force ==
When the Volunteers were subsumed into the new Territorial Force (TF) under the Haldane Reforms of 1908, the 1st Kent Brigade provided the Home Counties (Kent) Heavy Battery, RGA, including its ammunition column, and three companies of the Kent and Sussex Royal Garrison Artillery. However, this unit was broken up in 1910, the Kent batteries becoming the Kent RGA and the Sussex batteries forming a separate Sussex RGA.

The Home Counties (Kent) Heavy Battery was based at Beaton Street, Faversham, with its ammunition column at Chatham. Equipped with four 4.7-inch guns it formed part of the Home Counties Division of the TF.

The Kent RGA was a 'defended ports' unit organised as follows:

- HQ at Sheerness
- No 1 Company at Fort Clarence, Rochester, Kent
- No 2 Company at Gravesend
- No 3 Company at Dover

Nos 1 and 2 Companies formed part of Eastern Coast Defences at Chatham, while No 3 Company was in South Eastern Coast Defences at Dover.

== World War I ==
=== Mobilisation ===
On the outbreak of war on 4 August 1914, the Kent RGA went to its war stations manning the coast artillery and the Heavy Battery mobilised at Faversham. After mobilisation, units of the TF were invited to volunteer for Overseas Service, and on 15 August the War Office issued instructions to separate those men who had signed up for Home Service only, and form these into reserve units. On 31 August, the formation of a reserve or 2nd Line unit was authorised for each 1st Line unit where 60 per cent or more of the men had volunteered for Overseas Service. The titles of these 2nd Line units would be the same as the original, but distinguished by a '2/' prefix. In this way, duplicate companies, batteries and divisions were formed, mirroring those TF formations being sent overseas. Thus were formed the 2/1st, 2/2nd and 2/3rd Companies of the Kent RGA and the 1/1st and 2/1st Home Counties (Kent) Heavy Btys.

The Home Counties Division accepted the liability for service in India to release the regular units of the garrison there for active service on the Western Front. However, heavy artillery was not required for India, so when the division departed on 30 October, the 1/1st Bty stayed behind with the 2nd Home Counties Division that was being formed.

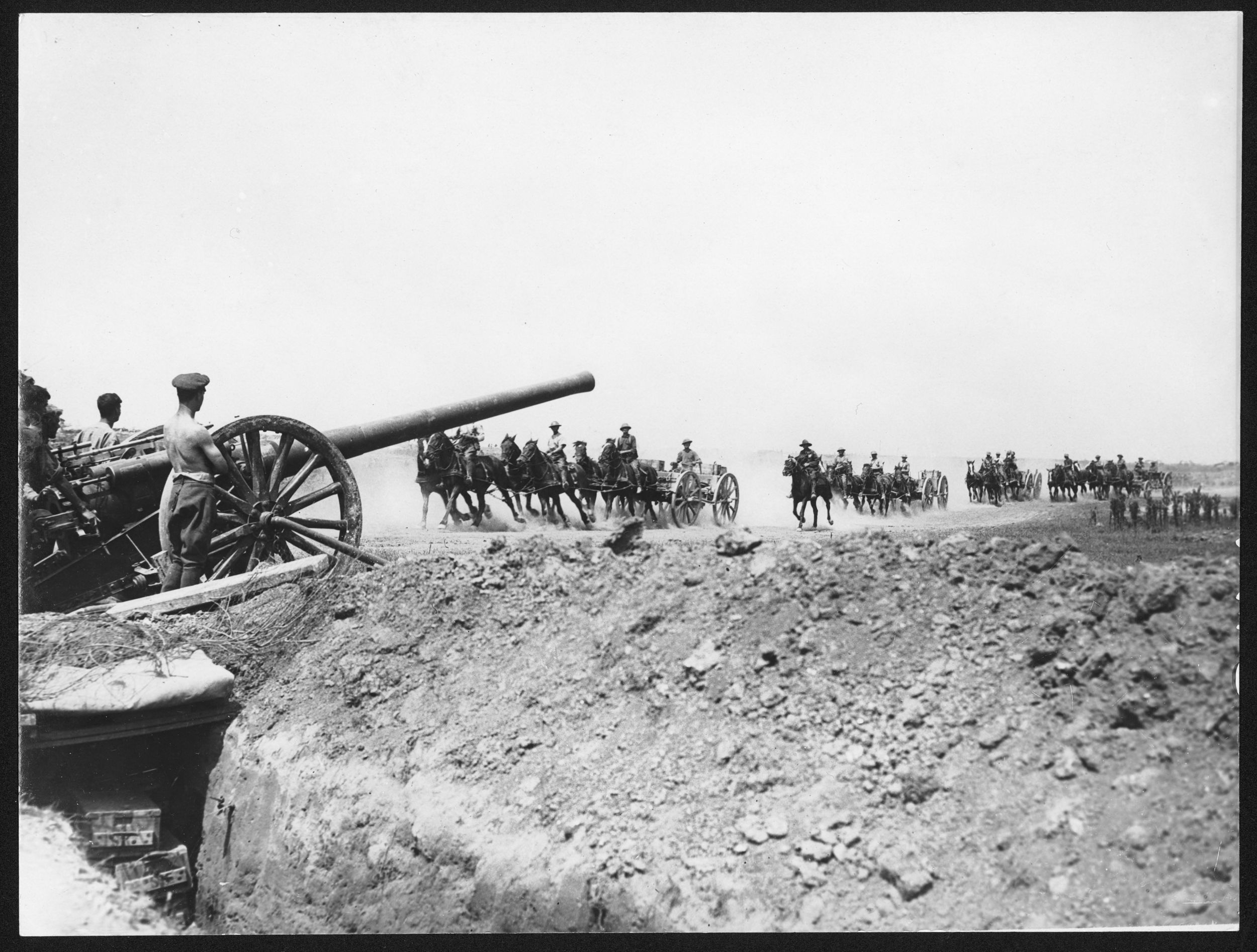
Transport limbers gallop past a battery of British 4.7 inch guns on the Somme.

=== 1/1st Kent Heavy Battery ===
The Home Counties Division accepted the liability for service in India to release the regular units of the garrison there for active service on the Western Front. However, heavy artillery was not required for India, so when the division departed on 30 October, the 1/1st Home Counties (Kent) Bty – usually referred to as the 1/1st Kent Bty – stayed behind with the 2nd Home Counties Division that was being formed. It went out to the Western Front on 29 December 1915 and joined Third Army.

The battery supported 56th (1/1st London) Division in the Attack on the Gommecourt Salient on 1 July, the first day of the Battle of the Somme. The Gommecourt attack was a disaster but it had only been a diversion from Fourth Army's main Somme offensive, and Third Army closed it down at the end of the first day. In August, the battery transferred to support Fourth Army in the continuing Somme offensive. Lack of ammunition and the worn state of the old 4.7-inch guns reduced its effectiveness.

Over the next two years, the 1/1st Kent Bty was moved from one Heavy Artillery Group (HAG) to another as circumstances demanded. On 12 February 1917, the battery was joined by a section of 118th Heavy Bty RGA to make it up to a strength of six guns. This was a regular unit formed at Woolwich shortly after the outbreak of war and had been in France with 4.7-inch guns since 6 November 1914. By now, the heavy batteries on the Western Front were adopting the modern 60-pounder in place of the obsolete 4.7-inch.

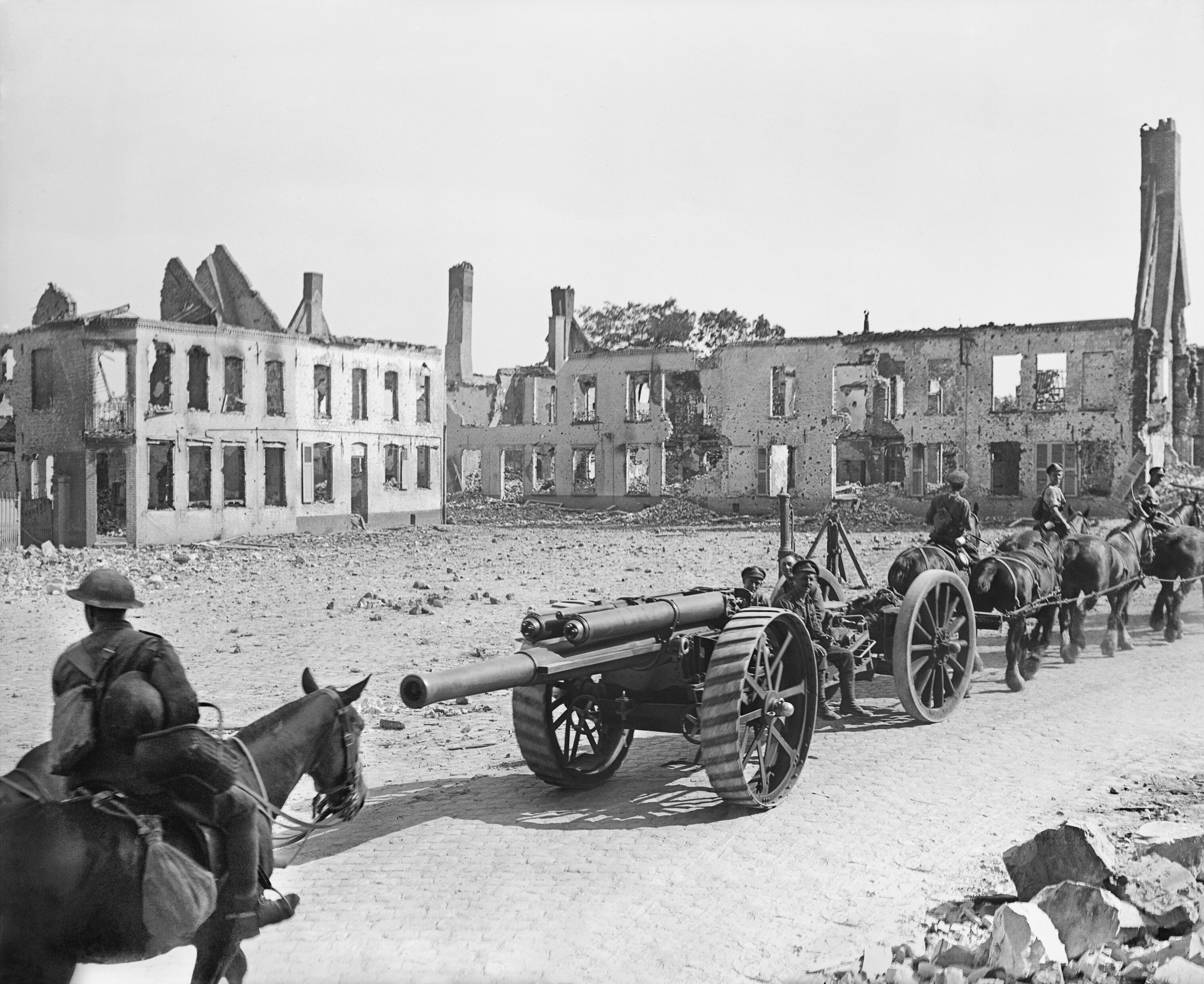
A 60-pounder moving up during the Hundred Days Offensive, 1918.

Fourth Army followed the German retreat to the Hindenburg Line in March 1917, then 1/1st Kent Bty transferred to Fifth Army for the Third Ypres Offensive, which culminated in the mud of the Battle of Passchendaele in October–November 1917. In late 1917, the HAGs became permanent brigades. 1/1st Kent Bty joined 92nd (Mobile) Brigade on 13 January 1918 and remained with it until the end of the war. On 1 February 1918, the HAGs became Brigades once more, and 92nd became 92nd (Mobile) Brigade, RGA, composed of four six-gun batteries of 60-pounders.

During the German Spring Offensive of March 1918, 92nd (M) Bde was sent from GHQ Reserve to reinforce the hard-pressed Third Army. 1/1st Kent Bty was caught up in the 'Great Retreat', saving its guns but losing the rest of its equipment. After refitting, the brigade remained with Third Army until the Armistice with Germany on 11 November 1918, having supported it in the Allies' victorious Hundred Days Offensive, including the battles of Albert, Bapaume, Cambrai and the Selle.

After the Armistice, the battery went to the Rhine with the Army of Occupation until it was demobilised in May 1919.

=== 2/1st Kent Heavy Battery ===
The battery formally separated from 1/1st Bty on 26 December 1914, but it was January 1916 before it received its guns. Even then, vital equipment such as sights were still lacking. 67th (2nd Home Counties) Division had a dual role of training drafts for units serving overseas and at the same time being part of the mobile force responsible for home defence. From November 1915 it formed part of Second Army, Central Force, quartered in Kent with 2/1st Bty at Ightham.

In September 1916, the battery moved to Mundesley in Norfolk, where it joined 4th Provisional Brigade. Provisional brigades were TF home defence formations composed of men who had not signed up for overseas service, but after the Military Service Act 1916 swept away the Home/Foreign service distinction all TF soldiers became liable for overseas service, if medically fit. The Provisional Brigades' role thus expanded to include physical conditioning to render men fit for drafting overseas. The 4th Provisional Brigade became the 224th Mixed Brigade in December 1916 ('mixed' in this context indicating a formation of infantry and artillery with supporting units).

At the time of the Armistice, 2/1st Battery was still at Mundesley as part of 224th Mixed Bde.

=== Kent Royal Garrison Artillery ===
The Imperial German Navy only carried out 12 bombardments of British coastal targets during World War I, so most of the extensive coastal defences were never tested. Kent was, however, an exception to the inactivity, and the ports of Margate, Broadstairs, Ramsgate and Dover were bombarded in April 1917 (the Second Battle of the Dover Strait), and Dover was shelled again (the last such bombardment of the war) on 16 February 1918. The batteries at Ramsgate and Dover were engaged on these occasions.

Nos 1 and 2 Companies of the Kent RGA, together with Regular RGA companies, manned the Kent side of the Thames and Medway Defences (No 12 Fire Command at Sheerness and No 13 Fire Command at Grain, while No 3 Company, Kent RGA, along with Nos 40 and 46 Companies, RGA, manned the Dover Defences (No 11 Fire Command). These were developed as the war progressed, until by April 1918 they comprised:

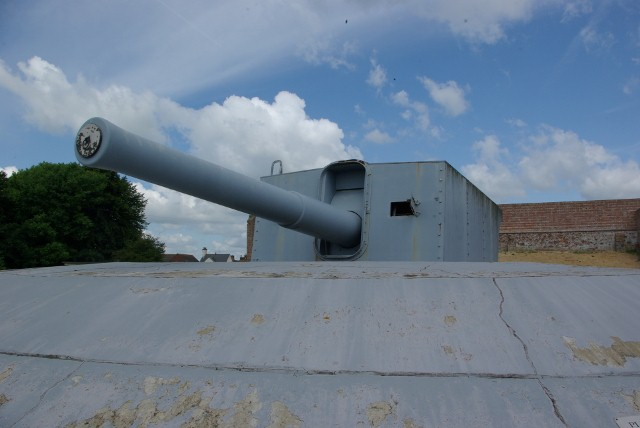
9.2-inch Coastal gun preserved at Imperial War Museum Duxford.

Dover Defences

- Dover Turret: 2 × 6-inch Mk VII guns
- Admiralty Pier Battery: 2 × 12-pounder QF guns
- South Breakwater Battery: 2 × 6-inch Mk VII guns
- Knuckle Battery: 3 × 4-inch QF guns
- Citadel Battery: 2 × 9.2-inch Mk X guns
- Langdon Battery: 3 × 9.2-inch Mk X, 2 × 6-inch Mk VII

Ramsgate Defences

- Harbour Battery: 2 × 12-pounder field guns

Meanwhile, although TF defended ports units never served overseas, those that had volunteered were supplying trained gunners to RGA units that were, and providing cadres to form complete new units for front line service. 62nd and 134th Siege Batteries formed at Sheerness in 1915 and Dover in 1916 are known to have had nuclei of men from the Kent RGA (and Sussex RGA in the case of the 134th). This may also have been the case for some of the numerous other siege batteries formed in the two garrisons during the war.

This process meant a continual drain on the manpower of the defended ports units and in April 1917, the coastal defence companies of the RGA (TF) were reorganised. By this stage of the war, the Dover and Newhaven Defences of Eastern Command consisted of 1/3 and 2/3 Companies of the Kent RGA and 1/1, 1/2, 2/1 and 2/2 Companies of the Sussex RGA. These six companies were reduced to just two (Nos 1 and 2 Companies, Sussex RGA), given a slightly higher establishment (five officers and 100 other ranks (ORs)), and the 1st and 2nd Line distinction was abolished. Nos 1 and 2 Kent Companies remained at Grain Fort and Grain Battery respectively.

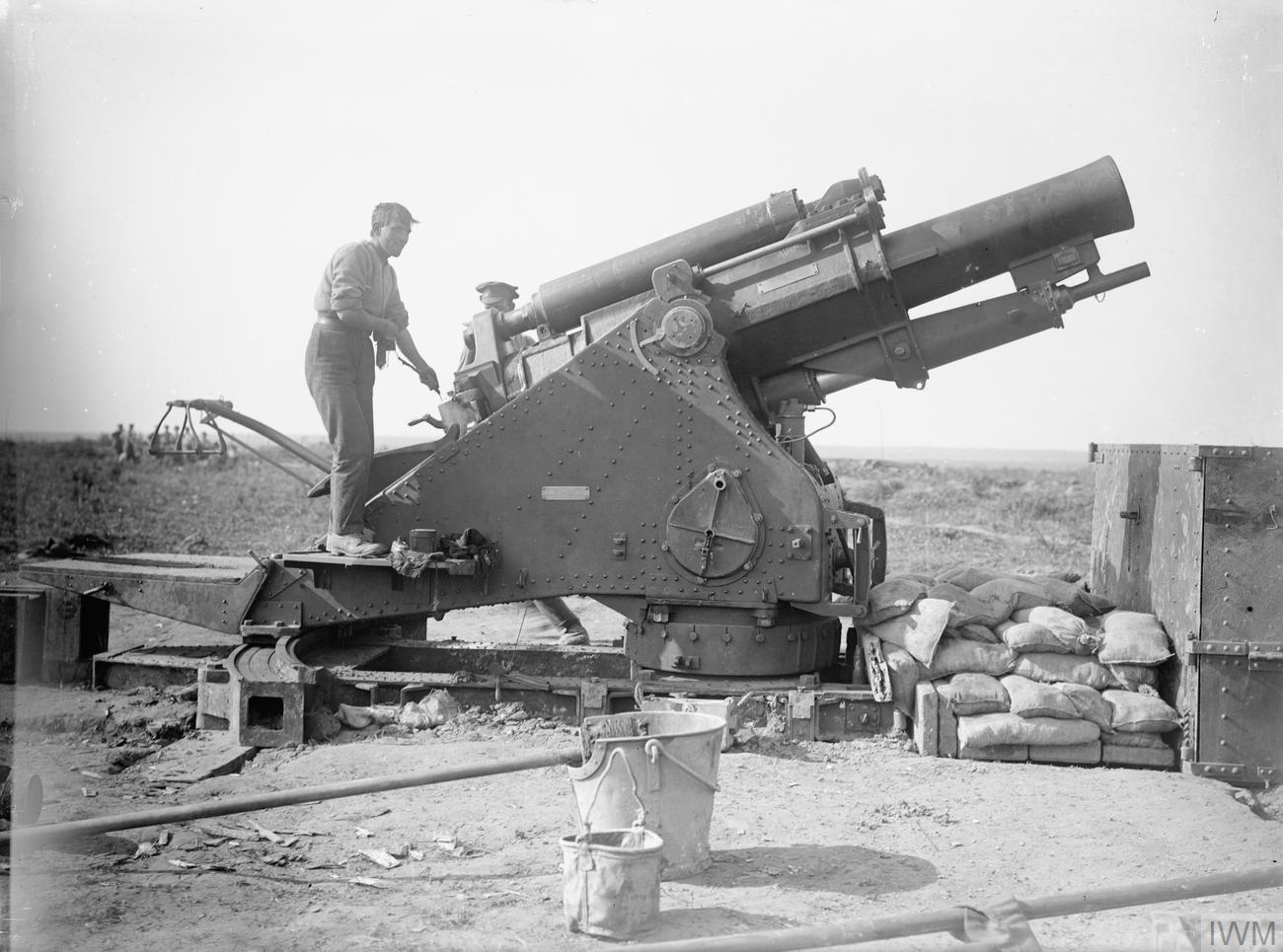
9.2-inch howitzer in action on the Somme, 1916.

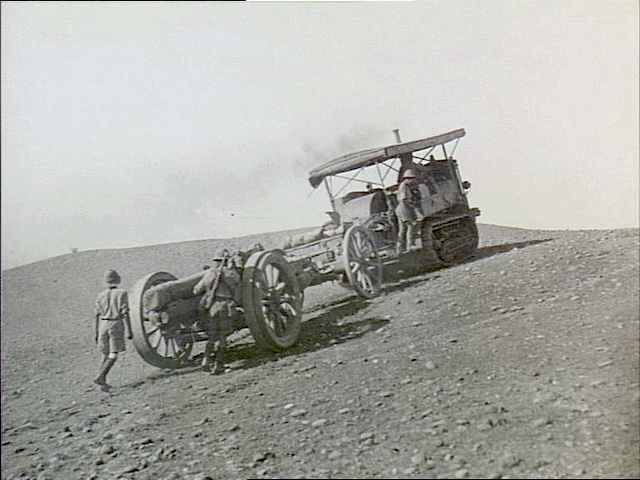
Holt 75 caterpillar tractor towing a 6-inch howitzer in the Middle East, 1918.

=== 62nd Siege Battery ===
62nd Siege Battery, RGA, was formed at Sheerness on 21 September 1915 with a nucleus of Territorials drawn from the Kent RGA. Equipped with four 9.2-inch howitzers it was sent out to the Western Front on 9 March 1916. It saw active service on the Western Front at the Somme and on the Ancre, at Bullecourt, Messines and Passchendaele. The battery was overrun and lost its guns during the German Spring Offensive, but was re-equipped and took part in the final Allied Hundred Days Offensive. 62nd Siege Battery was disbanded in 1919.

=== 134th Siege Battery ===
134th Siege Battery, RGA, was formed at Dover on 3 May 1916 with a nucleus of Territorials drawn from the Kent and Sussex RGA units. The battery was equipped with four modern 6-inch 26 cwt howitzers and was sent to the Macedonian front, arriving at Salonika on 20 August 1916. It served with XII Corps in the Vardar and Struma valleys. In 1917 it fought in the Second Battle of Doiran, but was then moved to the Palestine Front, where it fought with XXI Corps in the Third Battle of Gaza, the capture of Jerusalem and the victorious Battle of Megiddo. 134th Siege Battery was disbanded in 1919.

== Interwar ==
=== Kent Heavy Brigade ===
When the TF was reconstituted as the new Territorial Army (TA) in 1920, the Kent RGA was reformed in 1920, becoming the Kent Coast Brigade, RGA in 1921 and the Kent Heavy Brigade in 1924 when the RGA was subsumed into the Royal Artillery:

- HQ at Fort Clarence, Rochester
- 166 Hy Bty at Fort Clarence (166 (City of Rochester) Bty from 1925)
- 167 Hy Bty at Pelham Road, Gravesend
- 168 Hy Bty at Northampton Street, Dover
- 169 Hy Bty at High Street, Sheerness
- 170 Hy Bty at Willson's Road, Ramsgate

The brigade was assigned to 44th Home Counties Divisional Area.

In 1926, it was decided that the coastal defences of Great Britain should be solely manned by part-time soldiers of the TA. This entailed some reorganisation of units, and the scheme reached its final form in 1932. As a result, the brigade was split up on 1 October 1932. 166 (City of Rochester) Battery became an independent anti-aircraft (AA) battery, later joining 55th (Kent) AA Bde. 167 and 169 Batteries joined the Essex Heavy Brigade to form the Thames and Medway Heavy Brigade, RA, based at Rochester. The rest of the brigade merged with the single-battery Sussex Heavy Brigade to form the Kent and Sussex Heavy Brigade, RA:

- HQ at Lewes, Sussex, later at Liverpool Street, Dover
- 159 (Sussex) Bty at Brighton, later at North Street, Lewes
- 168 (Kent) Bty at Liverpool Street, Dover
- 170 (Kent) Bty at Willson's Road, Ramsgate

=== 205 (Chatham and Faversham) Battery ===
Meanwhile, the Home Counties (Kent) Heavy Battery was reconstituted as 205 (Chatham and Faversham) Medium Battery at Sittingbourne, later at the Drill Hall, Chatham. It formed part of 13th (Kent) Medium Brigade (formerly 4th Home Counties Brigade, Royal Field Artillery). This unit was soon redesignated 52nd (Kent) Medium Brigade, and in 1935 became 58th (Kent) Anti-Aircraft Brigade. The following year, 205 (Kent) AA Battery was transferred to 55th (Kent) AA Brigade (see above).

Early in 1939, as part of the doubling of the strength of the TA after the Munich Crisis, 205 (Kent) Battery left 55th AA Regiment (as RA brigades were now termed) to join a new 89th (Cinque Ports) AA Regiment, which was forming as a duplicate of 75th (Cinque Ports) AA Regiment. It served with Anti-Aircraft Command at the start of the war, but sailed for Egypt in December 1939. It then served with the Eighth Army in North Africa and Italy until it was placed in suspended animation in September 1944.

=== 166 (City of Rochester) Battery ===
At the start of World War II, 55th AA Regiment, including 166th (City of Rochester) Bty, was serving in Anti-Aircraft Command in the Heavy AA (HAA) role with 28th (Thames and Medway) Anti-Aircraft Brigade. During The Blitz 28th AA Bde guarded the Thames, Chatham and Dover in 6th AA Division. In 1941, the regiment left AA Command and became part of the War Office Reserve before sailing for the Middle East. It took part in the Allied invasion of Sicily in 1943 and the subsequent Italian Campaign, where in the absence of air attacks it frequently engaged ground targets in a medium artillery role. 55th (Kent) HAA Regiment was placed in suspended animation in 1946.

== World War II ==
=== Kent and Sussex Heavy Regiment ===
On the outbreak of World War II, the regiment went to its war stations manning coastal guns under Dover Fire Command. After the Dunkirk evacuation, the coastal defence of South East England became a critical priority. On 14 July, the Kent and Sussex Heavy Regiment was split into three separate coast regiments, each of three batteries.

=== 519th (Kent & Sussex) Coast Rgt ===
- RHQ at Dover
- A Bty at Langdon, later at Mill Point – redesignated 291 Bty 1 April 1941; transferred to 550th Coast Rgt 15 June 1942
- B Bty at Eastern Arm – redesignated 292 Bty 1 April 1941; transferred to 534th (Orkney) Coast Rgt by 13 April 1943
- C Bty at South Breakwater – redesignated 293 (6-inch) & 294 (6-pdr) Btys 1 April 1941
- D Bty at Ramsgate – formed 14 December 1940; redesignated 297 Bty 1 April 1941; disbanded by June 1943
- 411 Bty at St Margaret's – joined 31 December 1940; transferred to 26th Coast Artillery Group 5 April 1941
- 418 Bty at Knuckle, then Dover Western Heights by March 1943 – joined 31 December 1940, regimented 22 October 1941
- 217 Bty at Dover Pier Extension – joined from 520th (K&S) Coast Rgt 22 October 1941
- 414 Bty at Western Heights, Knuckle by March 1943 – joined from 520th (K&S) Coast Rgt 22 October 1941
- 296 Bty at Dover Turret – joined from 520th (K&S) Coast Rgt 22 October 1941; transferred to 563rd Coast Rgt 12 January 1943
- 412 Bty at Mill Point – joined from 550th Coast Rgt 15 June 1942
- 337 Bty at Deal – joined from 563rd Coast Rgt 12 January 1943
- 142 Bty – joined from 534th (Orkney) Coast Rgt by 13 April 1943
- 100 Coast Observer Detachment (COD) – joined by October 1942; disbanded by May 1943

The Coast Observer Detachments (CODs) began to appear in February 1941. They were equipped with early warning radar to detect surface ships and low-flying aircraft, and were later placed in direct communication with the coast artillery plotting rooms.

=== 520th (Kent & Sussex) Coast Rgt ===
- RHQ at Dover
- A Bty at Dover Citadel – redesignated 295 Bty 1 April 1941; transferred to 516th (Thames & Medway) Coast Rgt 16 April 1943
- B Bty at Dover Turret – redesignated 296 Bty 1 April 1941; transferred to 519th (K&S) Coast Rgt 22 October 1941
- C Bty at Dover Pier Extension – redesignated 169 Bty 1 April 1941; transferred to 533rd (Orkney) Coast Rgt 22 May 1941
- 414 Bty at Western Heights – joined 31 December 1940; transferred to 519th (K&S) Coast Rgt 22 October 1941
- 423 Bty at Lydden Spout Battery – joined from 551st Coast Rgt 4 March 1941
- 217 Bty (12-pdr) at Dover Pier Extension – joined from 72nd Coast Artillery Training Rgt 15 May 1941; transferred to 519th (K&S) Coast Rgt 22 October 1941
- 424 (Independent) Bty (6-inch) at Capel – joined 21 December 1941
- 428 Bty (6-inch) at Hougham Battery – joined from Coast Artillery Training Centre 21 December 1941
- 289 Bty at Fletcher – joined from 516th (T&M) Coast Rgt 16 April 1943
- 6 COD – joined by June 1941; disbanded by May 1943
- 21 COD – joined by June 1941; transferred to 540th Coast Rgt by January 1942
- 101 COD – joined by October 1942
- 22 COD – joined by November 1943

In the autumn of 1940, 520th Rgt was stationed at Landguard Fort at Harwich, but had returned to Dover Citadel by the end of 1941.

=== 521st (Kent & Sussex) Coast Rgt ===
- RHQ at Newhaven
- A Bty at Newhaven – redesignated 100 (6-inch) & 101 (12-pdr) Btys 1 April 1941
  - 100 Bty later at Ringborough; joined 512th (East Riding) Coast Rgt 6 July 1943
  - 101 Bty disbanded 15 March 1944 and new A Bty formed
- 343 Bty at Seaford, later Eastbourne – joined 31 December 1940
- 342 Bty at Eastbourne – joined from 552nd Coast Rgt 14 September 1942
- 359 Bty at Brighton – joined from 553rd Coast Rgt 14 September 1942
- 160 Bty at Newhaven – joined from 566th Coast Rgt 1 May 1943
- 193 Bty at Newhaven – joined from 512th (ER) Coast Rgt 6 July 1943
- 11, 12 CODs – joined by June 1941
- 29 COD – joined by June 1941; transferred to 544th Coast Rgt by January 1942
- 5, 13, 15, 109 CODs – joined by December 1942
- 14 COD – joined by December 1942; transferred to 532nd (Pembroke) Coast Rgt by January 1943
- 3 COD – joined by November 1943; transferred to 516th (T&M) Coast Rgt by March 1944
- 10 COD – joined by November 1943

=== Defence of Dover ===
Dover was in range of German batteries mounted on the French coast and their first shells fell on Dover on 12 August 1940. Prime Minister Winston Churchill ordered the emplacement of long-range guns and by September two long-range Counter Bombardment (CB) fire commands were being added to the harbour defences, manned by the Royal Artillery and Royal Marines. Eventually, the coast artillery at Dover was developed as follows:

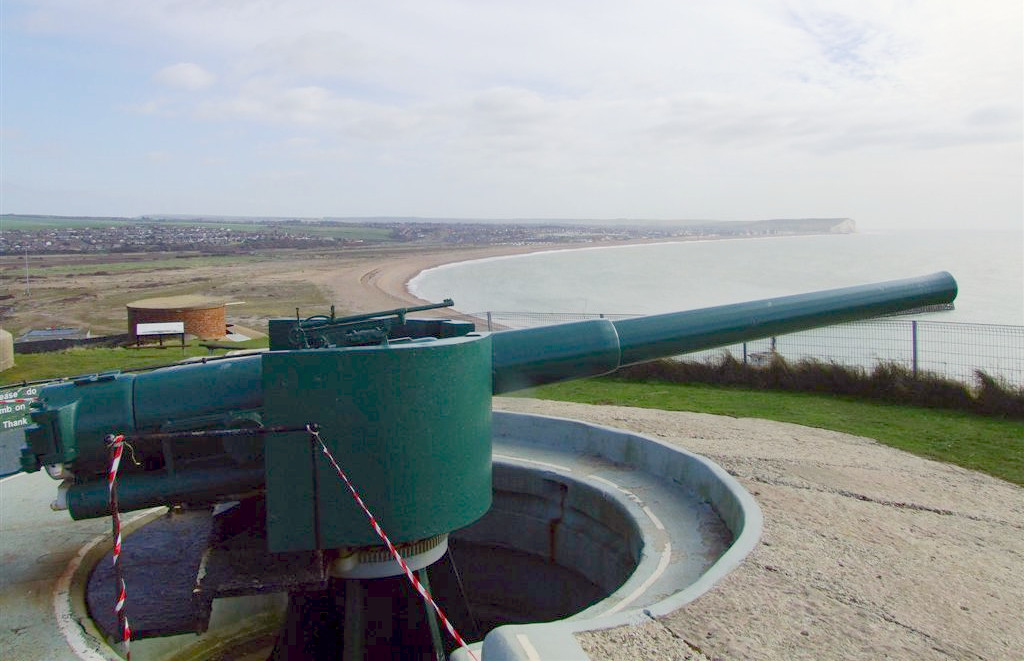
Mk VII 6-inch gun in typical coast defence emplacement, preserved at Newhaven Fort.

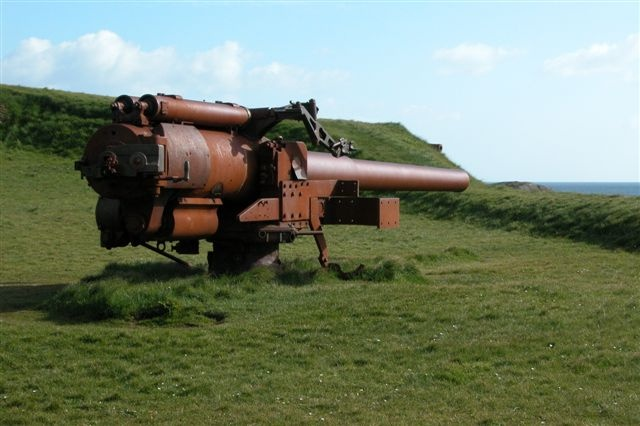
5.5-inch gun in wartime emergency position, preserved on the Faroe Islands.

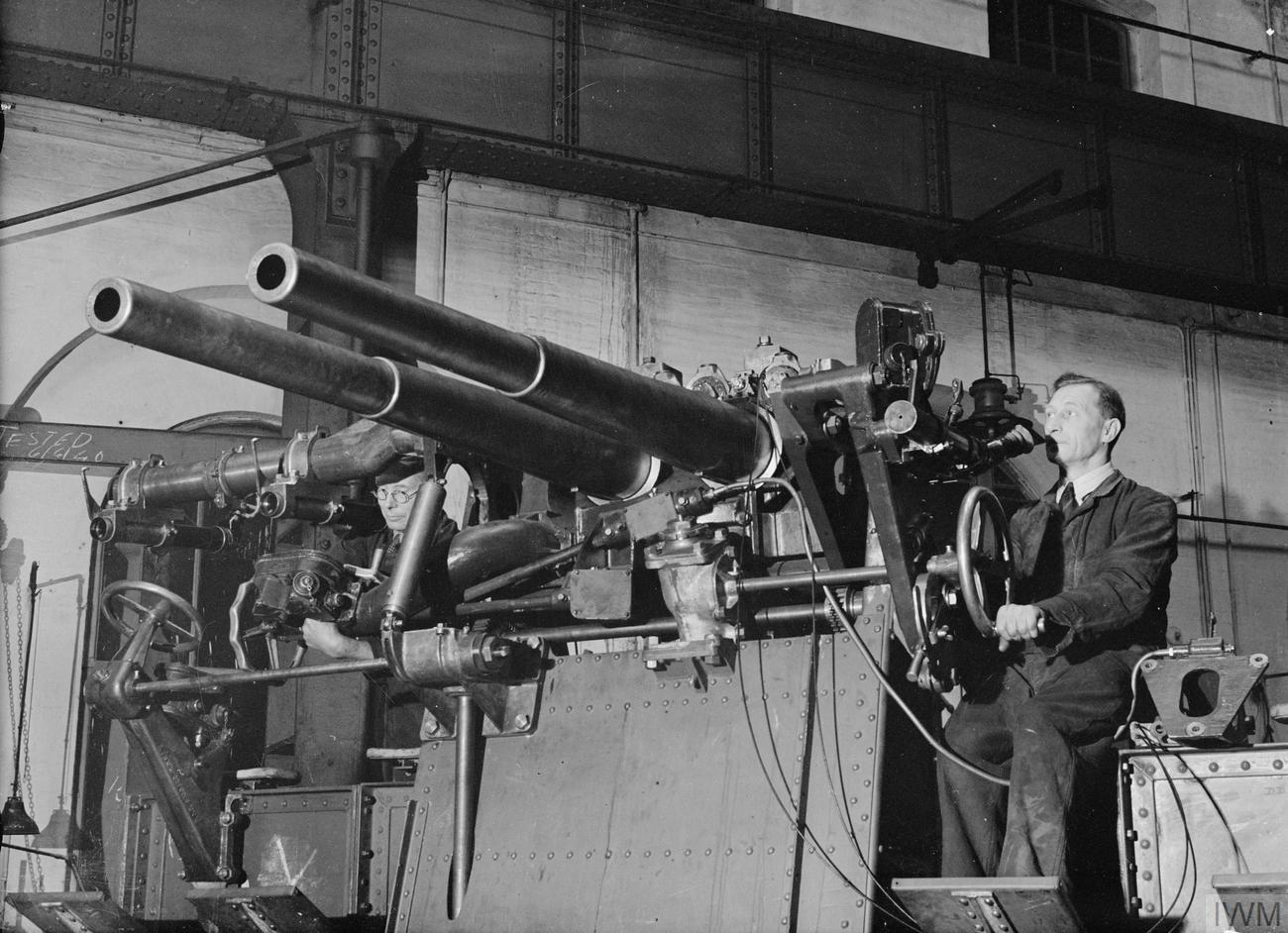
6-pounder Mark I guns in twin coastal artillery mount.

Western CB Fire Command

- Lydden Spout Battery: 3 × 6-inch guns installed May 1941
- Hougham Battery: 3 × 8-inch guns installed September 1942
- Capel: 3 × 8-inch guns installed May 1942

Harbour Fire Command

- Langdon Battery: 2 × 6-inch guns prewar; 1 gun added September 1940
- Dover Turret: 2 × 6-inch prewar
- Breakwater: 2 × 6-inch and 2 × 9.2-inch prewar; 1 twin 6-pounder added May 1940
- Dover Western Heights: 2 × 6-inch installed September 1940
- Eastern Arm: 2 × twin 6-pounder installed September 1939
- Pier Extension: 2 × 12-pounder guns prewar; 1 gun added February 1940
- Knuckle: 2 × 4-inch installed August 1940

Eastern CB Fire Command

- Wanstone Battery: 4 × 5.5-inch guns installed September 1940; 2 × 15-inch guns installed September 1942

Newhaven

- Newhaven Fort had 4 × 6-inch and 2 × 12-pounder guns.

Two further batteries were added later ar Dover:

- Fan Bay Battery: 3 × 6-inch, completed February 1941
- South Foreland Battery: 4 × 9.2-inch, completed October 1941

By May 1942, 519th and 520th Coast Rgts in Kent came under the command of XII Corps Coast Artillery HQ (CAHQ), while 521st Coast Rgt in Sussex came under Canadian Corps CAHQ. By July 1942, CA Plotting Rooms (later termed Army Plotting Rooms) had been created for the most important coast defences, with No 1 at Dover under the Corps Commander, Coast Artillery (CCCA), XII Corps and No 2 at Newhaven under CCCA Canadian Corps. In May 1943, when XII Corps and Canadian Corps were assigned to 21st Army Group for the forthcoming Allied invasion of Normandy (Operation Overlord), their coastal defence role was taken over by East Kent and Sussex Districts respectively under South Eastern Command.

=== Late war ===
By 1942, the threat from German attack had diminished, the coast defences were seen as absorbing excessive manpower and there was demand for trained gunners for the fighting fronts. A process of reducing the manpower in the coast defences began. However, the Dover guns remained in commission in order to deny the straits to hostile shipping. The manpower requirements for the Allied invasion of Normandy, Operation Overlord, led to further reductions in coast defences in April 1944. By this stage of the war, many of the coast battery positions were manned by Home Guard detachments or were in the hands of care and maintenance parties. On 1 April, 520th and 521st (K&S) Coast Rgt absorbed the batteries of 550th–553rd Coast Rgts, which were being disbanded, giving the three Kent & Sussex regiments the following organisation:

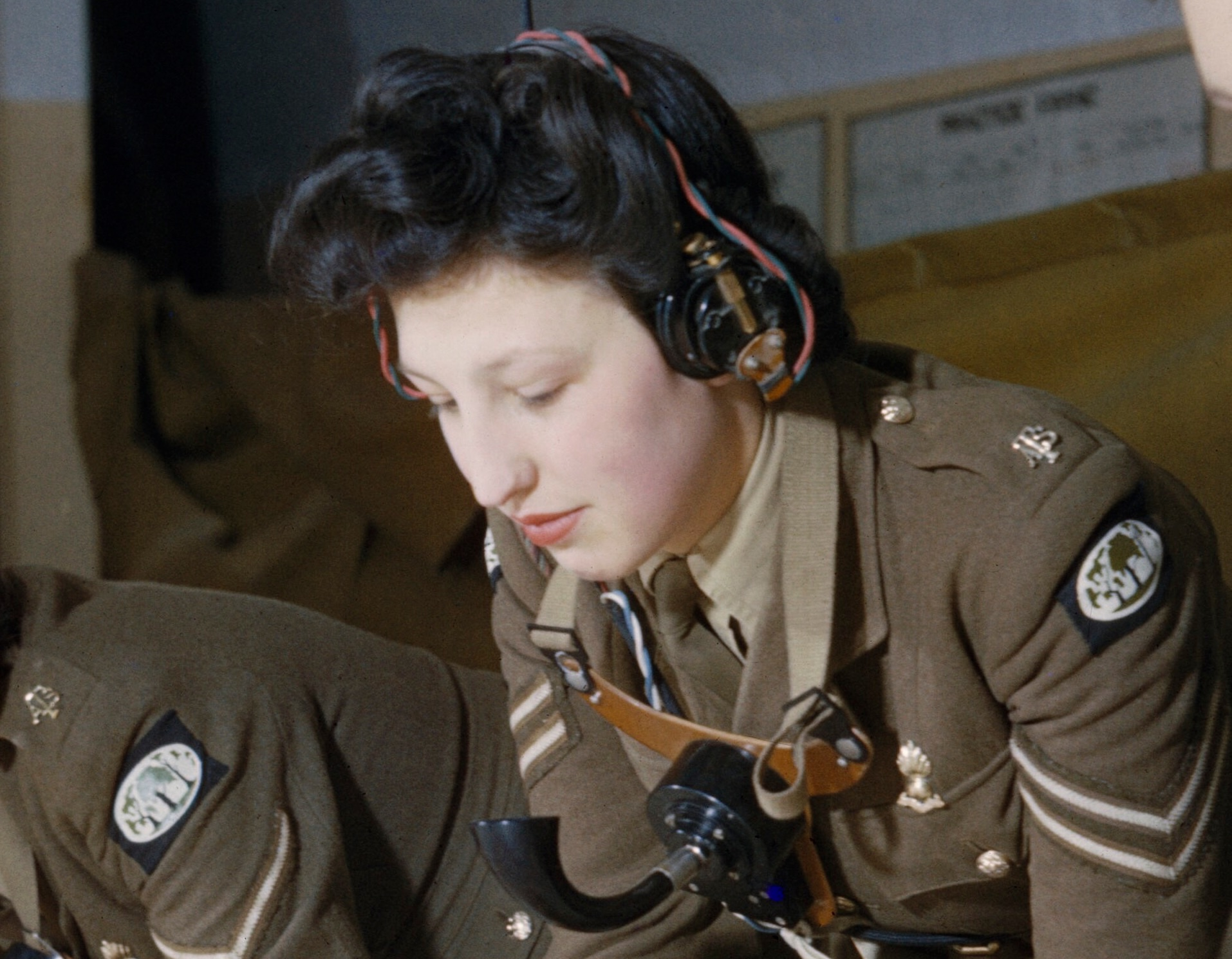
Women of the Auxiliary Territorial Service (ATS) serving with 428 Bty at Coast Defence HQ, Dover, December 1942. (Note RA 'bomb' badge worn above breast pocket).

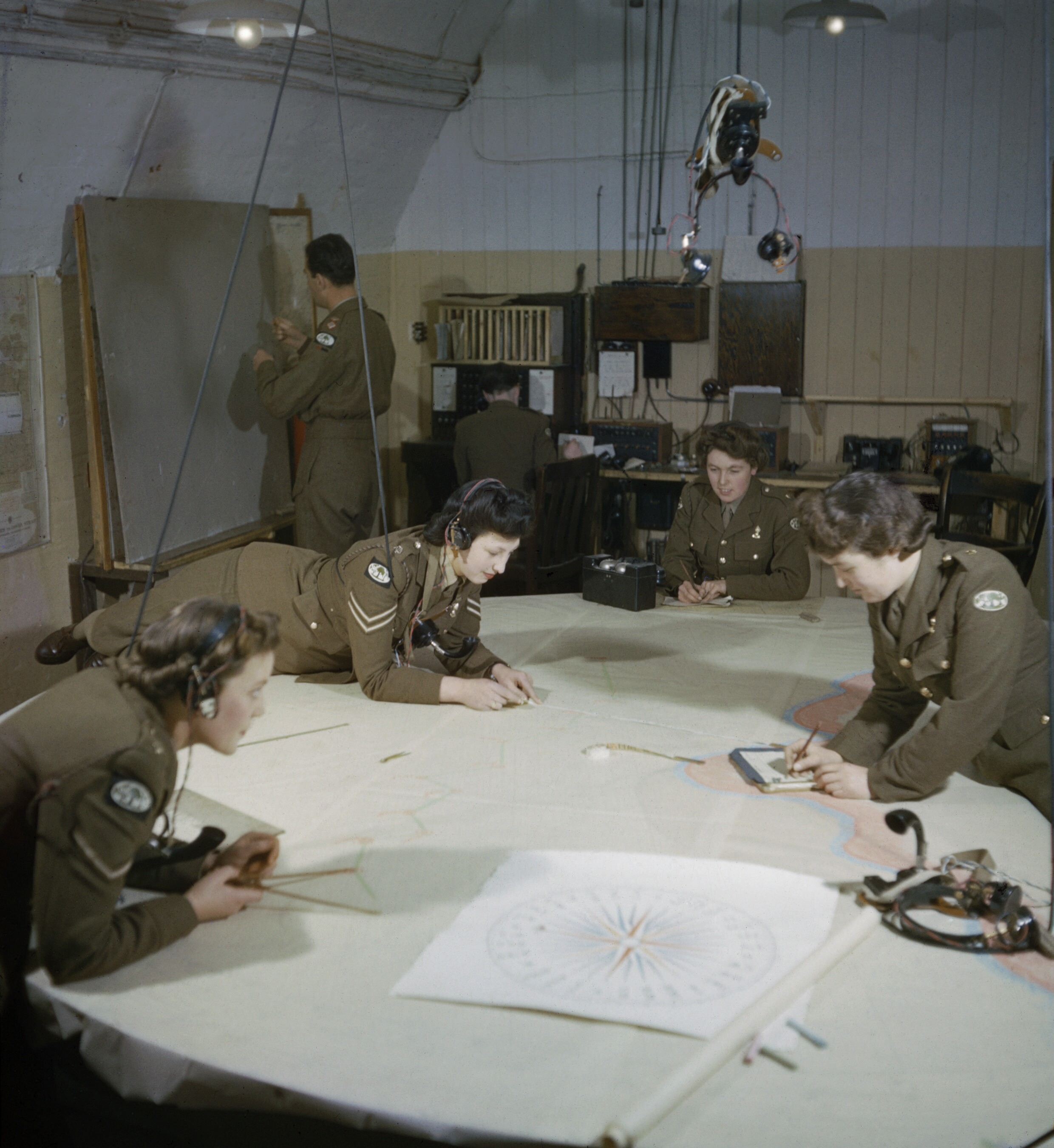
ATS plotters at work at 428 Bty.

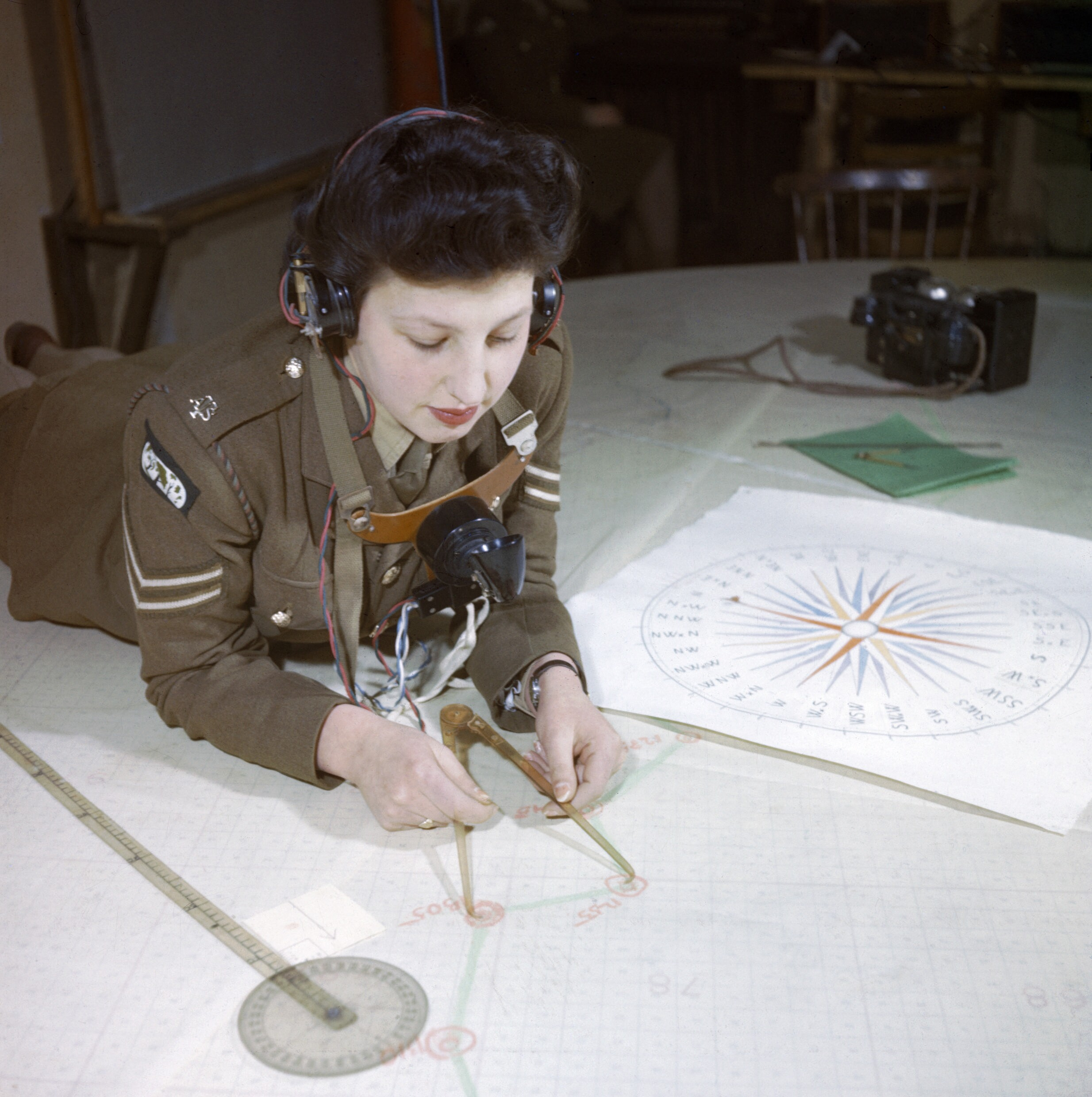
Miss Elizabeth Amery, ATS, computes the range at 428 Bty.

- 519th (K&S) Coast Rgt
  - 217, 292, 293, 294, 337, 412, 414, 418 Btys
  - 289 Bty – from 520th (K&S) Rgt
- 520th (K&S) Coast Rgt
  - 423, 424, 428 Btys
  - 194, 335, 340, 415, 416 Btys – from 550th Coast Rgt
  - 213, 230, 233, 235, 291, 374, 413 Btys – from 551st Coast Rgt
  - 101 Coast Observer Detachment
  - 16 Coast Observer Detachment – from 551st Coast Rgt
- 521st (K&S) Coast Rgt
  - 160, 193, 342, 343, 359 Btys
  - 221, 237, 301, 360, 375 – from 552nd Coast Rgt
  - 149, 344, 345, 346, 403 – from 553rd Coast Rgt

From now on, the regiments were effectively holding units for the remaining cadres of coast units in south east England, and most of the CODs were disbanded. South Eastern Command was abolished at the end of 1944 and the regiments came under Eastern Command.

On 1 June 1945, after VE Day, the three regiments were consolidated (together with 540th and 549th Coast Rgts) into a single regiment, with many batteries disbanded (or placed in 'suspended animation' (S/A) in the case of established TA units):

- 519th (K&S) Coast Rgt
  - RHQ, 217, 292, 294, 337 Btys
  - 289, 293 Btys S/A
  - 412, 414, 418 Btys disbanded
  - 160 Bty transferred from 521st (K&S) Coast Rgt
  - 185 Bty transferred from 549th Coast Rgt
  - 203, 410 Btys transferred from 540th Coast Rgt
  - 233, 335, 340, 413, 423 Btys transferred from 520th (K&S) Coast Rgt
  - 6, 101, 102 CODs disbanded by October 1945
- 520th (K&S) Coast Rgt
  - RHQ & 428 Bty
  - 291 Bty S/A
  - 194, 213, 235, 415, 416, 424 Btys disbanded
- 521st (K&S) Coast Rgt
  - RHQ & 193 Bty S/A
  - 342, 343, 359 Btys disbanded

519th (K&S) Coast Rgt and all its batteries passed into S/A on 10 January 1946, and 520th (K&S) Coast Rgt and its one remaining battery did likewise in March 1946.

== Postwar ==
On 1 January 1947, when the TA was reconstituted, 520th Regiment was disbanded, while 519th and 521st were reformed as 410th (Kent) Coast Regiment and 411th (Sussex) Coast Regiment respectively. The Kent unit was organised as follows:

- RHQ Dover
- P Bty Dover
- Q Bty at Folkestone
- R Bty at Ramsgate
- S Bty at Dover

410 (Kent) Coast Regiment formed part of 101 Coast Brigade in Eastern Command. The coast artillery branch was disbanded in 1956, and the regiment was converted to the infantry role, becoming 5th Battalion The Buffs (Royal East Kent Regiment). (Note: This battalion replaced the 5th (Weald of Kent) Bn, which had fought in Mesopotamia during World War I, before merging with 4th Bn interwar, and also the 5th Bn of World War II, which was a duplicate of 4th Bn.) This battalion later became 7th Bn Queen's Regiment (East Kent).

== Honorary Colonels ==
The following served as Honorary Colonel of the unit:

- J.B. White, appointed to 1st KAVC 20 October 1887
- J.D. Palmer, appointed to 1st KAVC 5 November 1892
- Sir Horatio G.G. Palmer, appointed to 1st Kent RGA (V) 18 September 1904 and to Kent TGA (TF) 14 June 1911
- Sir Henry Lennard, 2nd Bt, appointed to Kent Coast Bde 5 Apr 1922
- Maj the Hon J.J. Astor, MP, appointed to Kent Heavy Bde 23 November 1927, then joint Hon Col of Kent and Sussex Heavy Bde
- E.L Beves, VD, appointed to Sussex Heavy Bde 6 August 1929, then joint Hon Col of Kent and Sussex Heavy Bde
