= Huffam =

Huffam is a name. People with the name include:

- Mark Huffam, a British film and television producer
- James Palmer Huffam (1897–1968), a Scottish soldier and recipient of the Victoria Cross

== See also ==
- Charles Dickens (1812–1870), full name Charles John Huffam Dickens
- The Quincunx (The Inheritance of John Huffam), an epic novel by Charles Palliser
