= Terramesnil =

- Commune
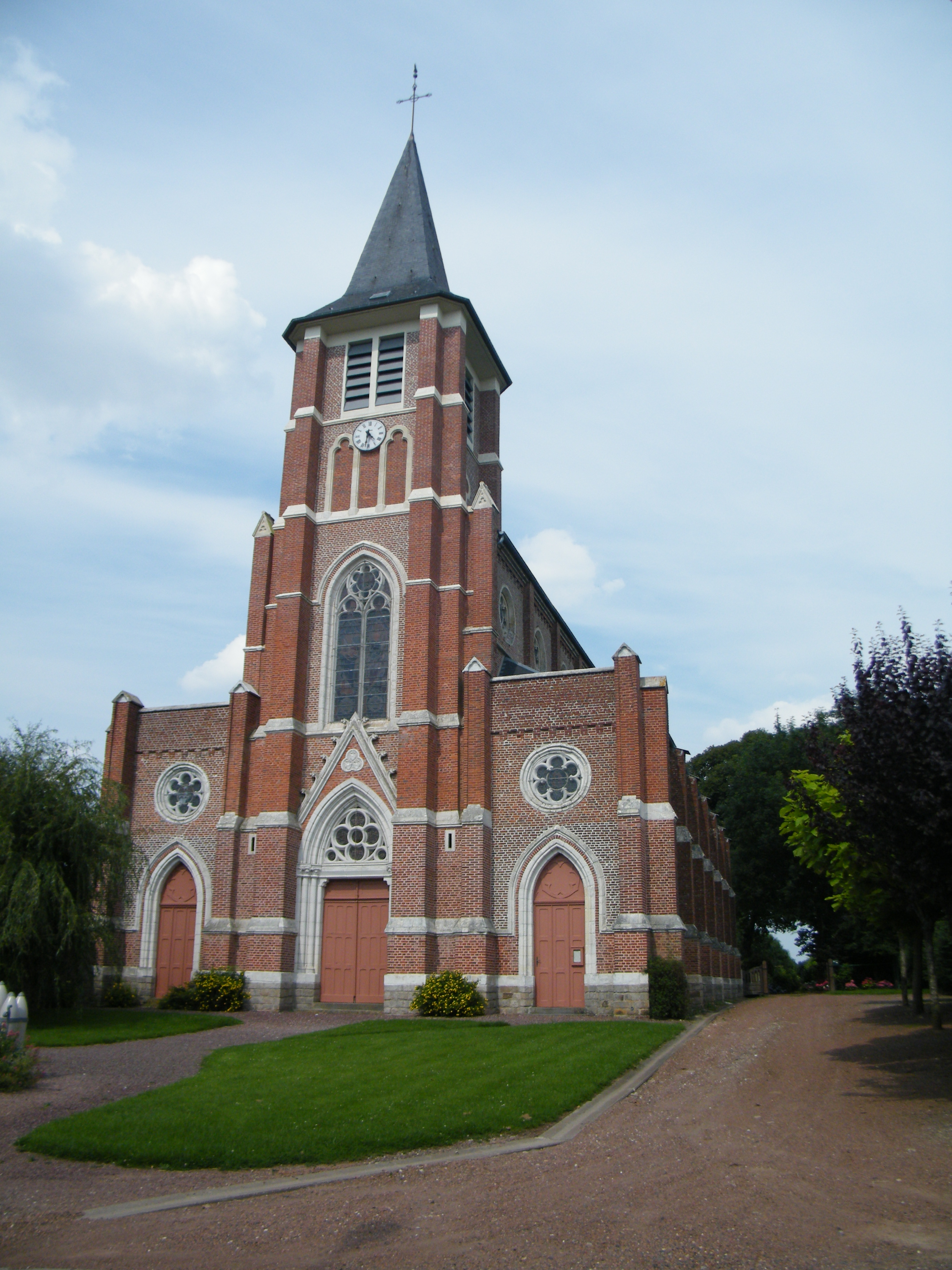
- The church in Terramesnil
- Location of Terramesnil
- Location within France Location within Hauts-de-France
- Coordinates: 50°06′23″N 2°22′56″E
- Country: France
- Region: Hauts-de-France
- Department: Somme
- Arrondissement: Amiens
- Canton: Doullens
- Intercommunality: CC Territoire Nord Picardie

Government
  - Mayor (2020–2026): Thierry Bouvet
- Area^{1}: 2.66 km^{2} (1.03 sq mi)
- Elevation: 136 m (446 ft)
- Highest elevation: 146 m (479 ft)
- Lowest elevation: 105 m (344 ft)
- Population (2023): 323
  - Density: 121/km^{2} (314/sq mi)
- Time zone: UTC+01:00 (CET)
  - Summer (DST): UTC+02:00 (CEST)
- INSEE/Postal code: 80749 /80600
- ^{1} French Land Register data, which excludes lakes, ponds, glaciers > 1 km^{2} (0.386 sq mi or 247 acres) and river estuaries.

Terramesnil (French pronunciation: [tɛʁamenil]; Picard: Téramoéni) is a commune in the Somme department in Hauts-de-France in northern France.

== Geography ==
Terramesnil is situated 16 miles (26 km) north of Amiens, on the D23 road and on the border with the department of the Pas-de-Calais

== Population ==
Historical population
Year	Pop.	±% p.a.
1968	290	—
1975	279	−0.55%
1982	280	+0.05%
1990	246	−1.61%
1999	230	−0.74%
2007	272	+2.12%
2012	285	+0.94%
2017	310	+1.70%
2023	323	+0.69%
Source: INSEE

== See also ==
- Communes of the Somme department
