= Hougham Battery =

Artillery battery in Kent, England

Coordinates: 51°6′26″N 1°16′12″E

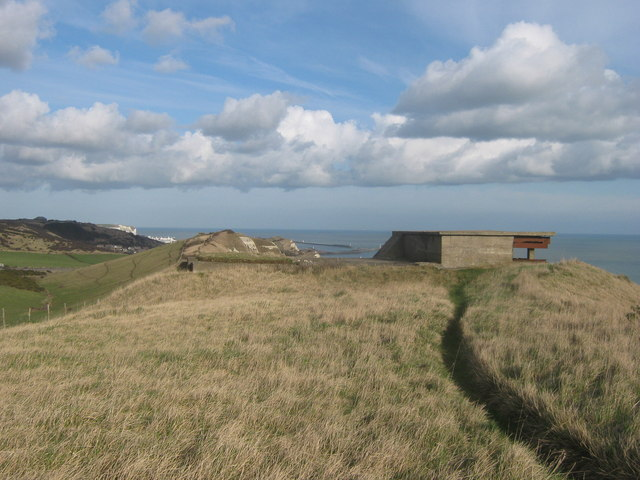
Hougham Battery on Round Down

Hougham Battery shown within Kent (grid reference TR29053921)

Hougham Battery is a World War II coastal defence battery built in 1941 between Dover and Folkestone in southeast England. It is on the cliff-edge between Abbot's Cliff and Shakespeare Cliff.

The 428th battery was equipped with three 8-inch (203 mm) Mark VIII naval guns. The complex was built in 1941 and manned by men of 520 Coastal Regiment Royal Artillery

The construction of the A20 in the 1970s caused most of the battery to be covered with earth, so little can be seen on the surface, though access is possible to the underground battery plotting room. Some of the observation posts on the cliff edge are also visible.

The batteries to the east and west of Dover were each designated as a fortress and each fortress had an underground plotting room from where the guns could be controlled. At Hougham. there are No.1, No.2 and No.3 Gun emplacements.

The North Downs Way (long-distance path) leads over Round Down (on the Dover Cliffs) between Folkestone and Dover. The path passes by several observation posts of the battery.

== See also ==
- South Foreland - site of a similar battery east of Dover
- Samphire Hoe - country park at the foot of the cliffs
- Dover Strait coastal guns
