= Niergnies =

- Commune
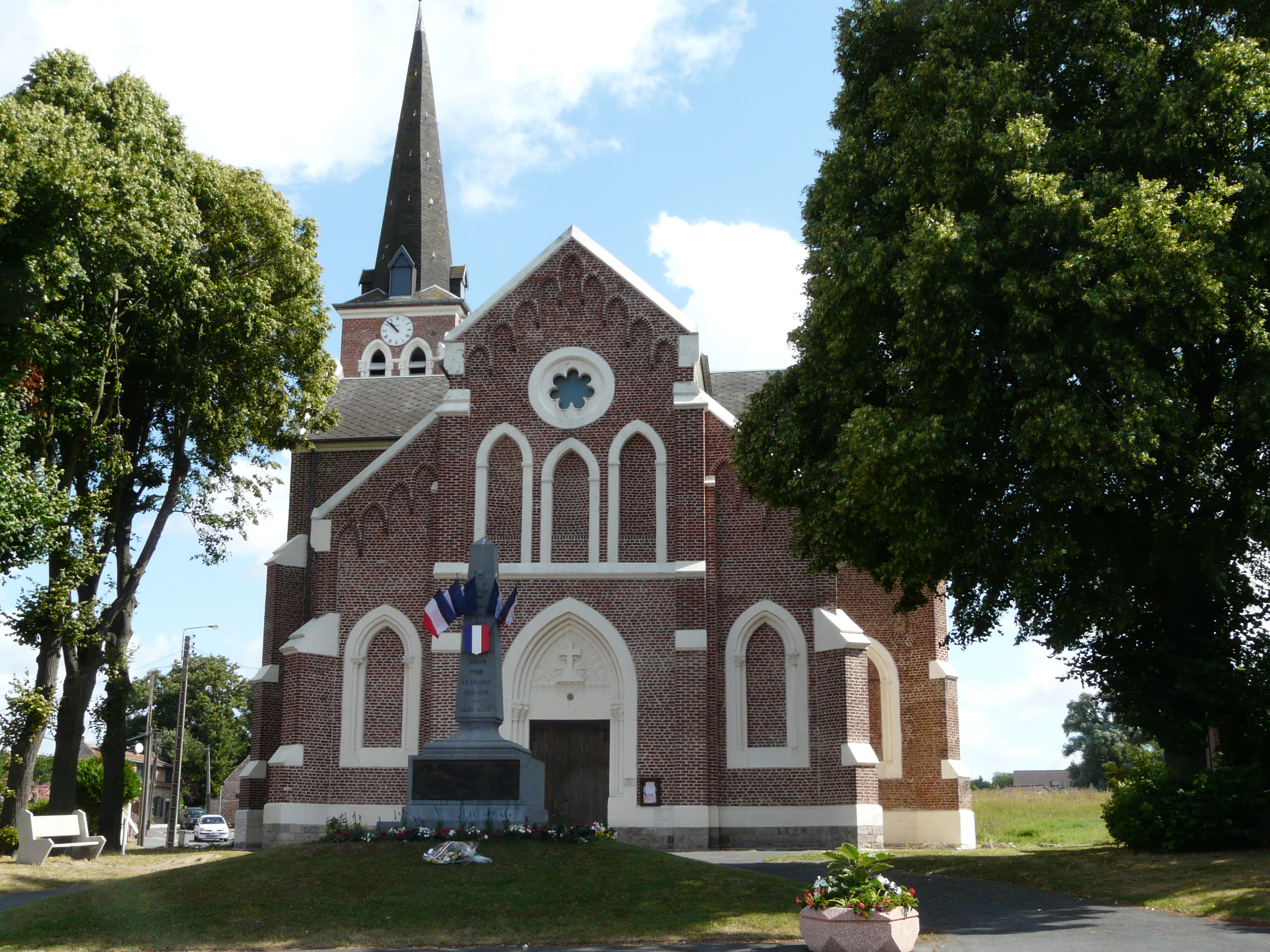
- The church in Niergnies

- Coat of arms
- Location of Niergnies
- Location within France Location within Hauts-de-France
- Coordinates: 50°08′53″N 3°15′22″E
- Country: France
- Region: Hauts-de-France
- Department: Nord
- Arrondissement: Cambrai
- Canton: Le Cateau-Cambrésis
- Intercommunality: CA Cambrai

Government
  - Mayor (2020–2026): Marjorie Gosselet-Cambrai
- Area^{1}: 4.37 km^{2} (1.69 sq mi)
- Elevation: 92 m (302 ft)
- Highest elevation: 104 m (341 ft)
- Lowest elevation: 76 m (249 ft)
- Population (2023): 509
  - Density: 116/km^{2} (302/sq mi)
- Time zone: UTC+01:00 (CET)
  - Summer (DST): UTC+02:00 (CEST)
- INSEE/Postal code: 59432 /59400
- ^{1} French Land Register data, which excludes lakes, ponds, glaciers > 1 km^{2} (0.386 sq mi or 247 acres) and river estuaries.

Niergnies (French pronunciation: [njɛʁɲi]) is a commune in the Nord department in northern France.

== Heraldry ==
Arms of Niergnies	The arms of Niergnies are blazoned : Vert, a sheep argent.

== See also ==
- Communes of the Nord department
