= Curridge =

Village in Berkshire, England

Coordinates: 51.444°N 1.292°W

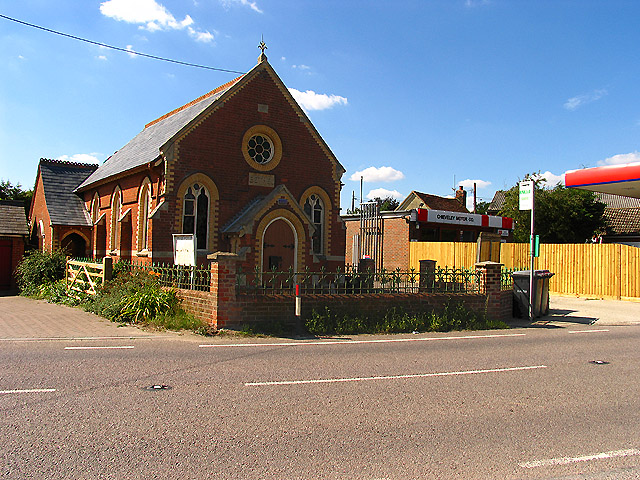
- Baptist Chapel, Curridge

- Location within Berkshire
- OS grid reference: SU491722
- Civil parish: Chieveley
- Unitary authority: West Berkshire
- Ceremonial county: Berkshire
- Region: South East
- Country: England
- Sovereign state: United Kingdom
- Post town: NEWBURY
- Postcode district: RG18
- Dialling code: 01635
- Police: Thames Valley
- Fire: Royal Berkshire
- Ambulance: South Central
- UK Parliament: Newbury

Curridge is a village in the civil parish of Chieveley in the English county of Berkshire.

== Geography ==
Curridge is located in the south-east of the parish, adjoining Hermitage. The chief population areas are Curridge village, Longlane and Denison Barracks, home of the 42 Engineer Regiment (Geographic), 77th Brigade, and the Royal School of Military Survey. Curridge is administered by the unitary authority of West Berkshire. Much of the local area is deciduous woodland and Faircross Plantation remembers the fact that the hundred court for Faircross Hundred once met there.

== History ==
King Edred's annals of 953 record the village of Custeridge as being given to Alfric, a deed witnessed by the Bishop of Ramsbury. The village's name is said to be derived from 'Cusa's Ridge'. It was a tithing of Chieveley. The manor of Curridge is known as Prior's Court because it was owned by Poughley Priory in Chaddleworth and the prior held his court there. In August 1207, King John seems to have had a few days' hunting in West Berkshire. He is reported in Curridge on the 3rd and Chieveley on the 5th. The Curridge Mission Church served as a chapel until 1965, when the last service was held. The ecclesiastical links with Chieveley were severed and Curridge is now linked with Hermitage. The 20th century poet, printer and artist, Ralph Chubb, lived at Curridge.
