= Alastair Bruce of Crionaich =

British Army officer and historical advisor

Major General Alastair Bruce of Crionaich CB OBE TD VR DL
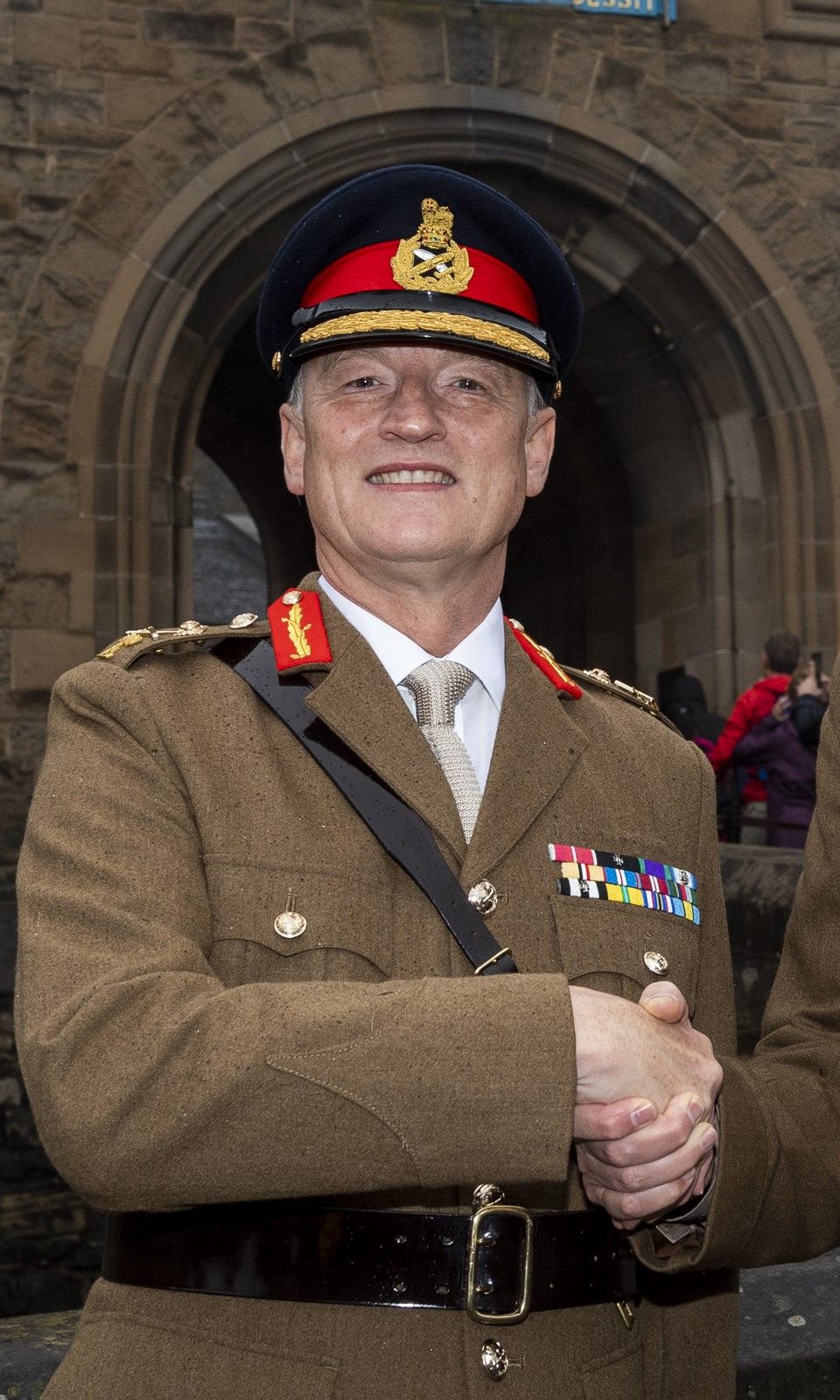
- Major General Bruce in 2019
- Born: Alastair Andrew Bernard Reibey Bruce; 25 June 1960 (age 66); Winchester, Hampshire, England
- Spouse: Stephen Knott (m. 2021)
- Relatives: Earls of Elgin and Kincardine; Earls of Portsmouth
- Military career
- Allegiance: United Kingdom
- Branch: British Army
- Service years: 1979–2024
- Rank: Major General
- Units: Scots Guards; Security Assistance Group
- Commands: Governor of Edinburgh Castle
- Conflicts: Falklands War; Iraq War; The Troubles
- Awards: Companion of the Order of the Bath; Officer of the Order of the British Empire; Volunteer Reserves Service Medal
- Other work: Fitzalan Pursuivant Extraordinary; Dir. Ceremonies, Order of St John

Major-General Alastair Andrew Bernard Reibey Bruce of Crionaich CB OBE TD VR DL (born 25 June 1960), is a British television journalist and former senior officer in the British Army Reserves who served as Governor of Edinburgh Castle from 2019 until 2024.

Royal, Religious and National Events Commentator for Sky News, Bruce was previously engaged by the BBC, and was historical adviser to several feature films and the ITV series Downton Abbey. He has been a commentator on many major state events in the United Kingdom, including the state visit of Pope Benedict XVI in 2010, the wedding of Prince William and Catherine Middleton in 2011, the Queen's Diamond Jubilee in 2012, the coronation of Charles III and Camilla in 2023, and the deaths and funerals of Diana, Princess of Wales in 1997, Queen Elizabeth the Queen Mother in 2002, Prince Philip, Duke of Edinburgh in 2021, and Queen Elizabeth II in 2022.

Bruce commanded the TA Media Operations Group before his appointment as Governor of Edinburgh Castle and continues to serve as an officer of arms in the Royal Household.

== Early life and education ==
Alastair Andrew Bernard Reibey Bruce was born on 25 June 1960 in Winchester, Hampshire, England, the younger son of Lieutenant Commander Henry Victor Bruce of Salloch and Helen Vernon Wallop née William-Powlett, daughter and co-heiress of Vice Admiral Sir Peveril William-Powlett. His great-grandfather was the 8th Earl of Elgin. Brought up in Hampshire, he spent much of his childhood in Sutherland, in the far north of the Scottish Highlands, where his parents owned the Sallachy Estate near the village of Lairg.

Bruce was educated at Milton Abbey School, an independent boarding school for boys (now co-educational), in Milton Abbas, Dorset, before attending the Royal Military Academy Sandhurst in Berkshire.

== Life and career ==
=== Armed forces ===
Commissioned in the British Army, in 1979, Bruce was promoted, the following year, to lieutenant in the 2nd Battalion of the Scots Guards. He served as a regular officer for four years, seeing active service in the Falklands War of 1982. The following year, he erected a cairn at Sallachy in Sutherland, in memory of his orderly in the Falklands, Guardsman James Reynolds, from the village of Bridge of Weir in Renfrewshire, who was killed in action while rescuing a wounded comrade, who survived. Reynolds died at the age of 19 at Tumbledown Mountain, then being the only soldier to be awarded the Distinguished Conduct Medal posthumously. At the time, Lieutenant Bruce said: "On returning to Britain after the Falklands, I decided I wanted to do something in honour of Jim Reynolds. He was such a brave young man who was well-liked by everyone".

An Assistant Vice-President with Merrill Lynch from 1983 to 1989, Bruce remained a military reservist. In 2004, he took command of the reserve unit, Media Operations Group, co-ordinating media representation of military activity. In the same year, he was mobilised on active operations in Iraq, serving in Operation TELIC. He was promoted Colonel in the Territorial Army, and became the equerry to Prince Edward. He accompanied HRH the Earl of Wessex to events such as the Wedding of Albert II, Prince of Monaco, and Charlene Wittstock. After serving as Director of Ceremonies of the Order of St John, in 2008, Bruce was appointed a Knight of St John (OStJ (1991); CStJ (1997)), and in 2010, became an Officer of the Order of the British Empire in the Queen's Birthday Honours for "services to the Territorial Army". He was Deputy Commander of 3rd Division and Colonel of the London Scottish Regiment.

In 2019, Bruce succeeded Major General Michael Riddell-Webster as Governor of Edinburgh Castle and was promoted to the rank of major general. He served in the post until September 2024.

In 2020, Bruce was appointed Honorary Colonel of 5 Military Intelligence Battalion; and from December 2021 to August 2026 he was Honorary Colonel of Tayforth Universities Officers' Training Corps. He was further appointed Honorary Colonel of the 6th Battalion The Royal Regiment of Scotland Army Reserve from 1 December 2023.

Bruce was appointed a Deputy Lieutenant for Greater London on 9 October 2012, and a Deputy Lieutenant of Hampshire in March 2026.

Bruce was appointed a Companion of the Order of the Bath (CB) in the 2025 New Year Honours.

==== Officer of Arms ====
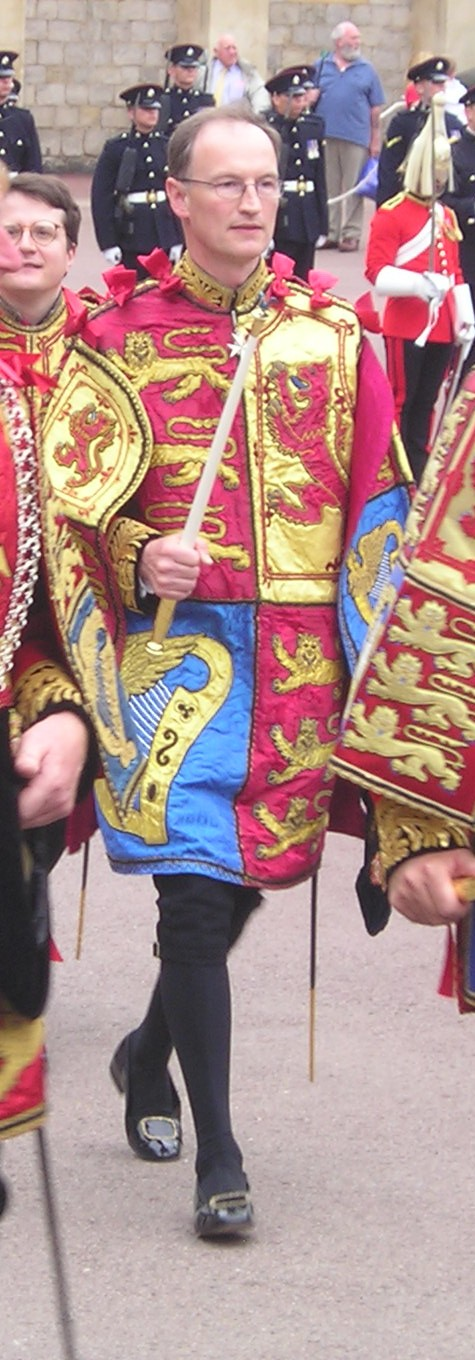
Bruce processing as Fitzalan Pursuivant

Queen Elizabeth II appointed Bruce as one of her heralds on 7 October 1998 as Fitzalan Pursuivant, and he has served as a member of the Royal Company of Archers, the Sovereign's ceremonial bodyguard in Scotland, since 1990.

=== Television, film and publications ===
==== Historian ====
Bruce has worked as a historical advisor to Oscar-winning films such as The King's Speech (2010) and The Young Victoria (2009), and the BAFTA-winning television series Downton Abbey (2010–2015) in which he provided historical accuracy as far as possible while balancing this with the need not to slow down the story unduly. He also advised on the minutiae of early 20th-century society protocol, in such subjects as dress, posture, the serving of food and even on matters that might initially appear trivial, such as the use of vocabulary or the correct way to step out of a car.

Bruce has written many books, and worked with several independent production companies in the preparation of television documentaries which are regularly aired on the BBC, America's PBS network, Discovery Channel and A&E channels. Among these are Nicholas and Alexandra, Victoria and Albert (2001) and Days of Majesty.

==== Royal documentary ====
In 2017, Bruce recorded a conversation with Queen Elizabeth II for the BBC: the Queen spoke about her coronation, more than 60 years earlier, in a programme entitled The Coronation.

==== Academia ====
Bruce has lectured widely throughout Britain, Europe and the United States; his subjects range from the last Tsars of Russia to British monarchy and the Vatican. In 2011, he was appointed Honorary Professor of Media at the University of Winchester.

In 2024, Bruce unsuccessfully ran for election as Chancellor of Oxford University.

Scouting

The Bruce family funds the Lieutenant Commander Henry V Bruce Award for Hampshire Scouts which rewards inspirational young people in scouting, because of Lieutenant Commander Bruce's long term association with Hampshire Scouts. Bruce is also a Hampshire Scouts ambassador.

=== Personal life ===
Recognised in the name of Bruce of Crionaich by Lord Lyon King of Arms in 1984, on 3 July 2021, after 20 years together, Bruce was married to Stephen Knott at St John's Episcopal Church by the Bishop of Edinburgh.

Bruce is a godfather to James, Earl of Wessex, the only son of the Duke and Duchess of Edinburgh.

== Arms ==
Coat of arms of Major General Alastair Bruce of Crionaich
| Adopted Matriculated 12 December 1981 Crest A Lion statant, Tail extended Sable, armed and langued Gules Helm That of a knight Escutcheon Or a Saltire and Chief Gules, on a Dexter Canton Argent a Lion rampant Azure armed and langued of the Second, on a Sinister Canton Argent a Bend wavy Sable Motto Fuimus et Sumus ("We have been and We are") Orders Behind the Shield, the Badge of St John, surrounded by the Bath circlet: ; Banner Conjoint Banner of Maj-Gen. Alastair Bruce of Crionaich & Mr. Stephen Knott Other versions Bruce of Crionaich quartering Powlett, and Bruce/Powlett quarterly impaling Knott:; |

== Honours and decorations ==

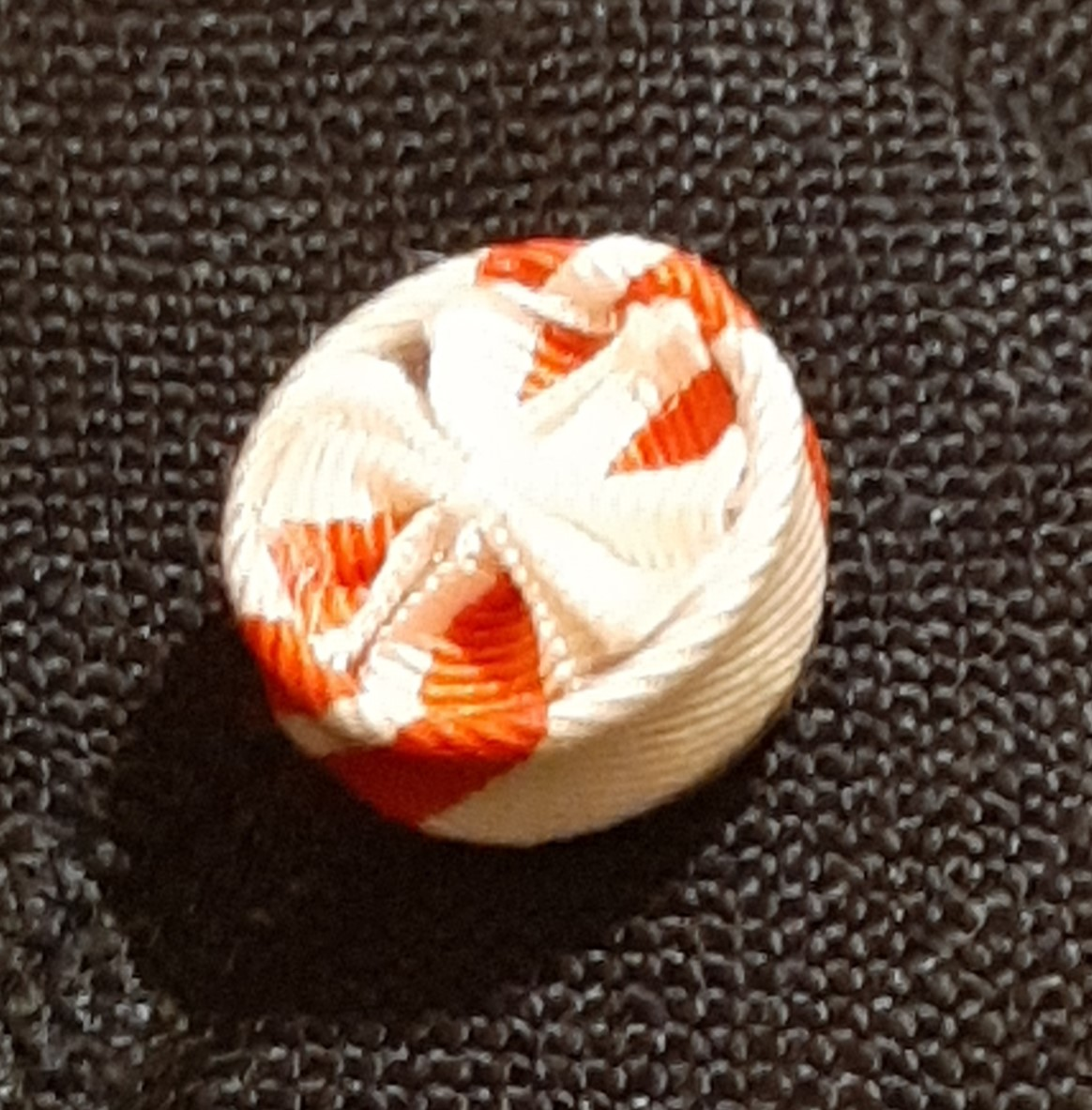

| Ribbon | Country | Appointment | Notes |
|---|---|---|---|
| | United Kingdom | Companion of the Order of the Bath | Appointed Companion (CB) on 30 December 2024 |
| | Commonwealth of Nations | Officer of the Order of the British Empire | Appointed Officer (OBE) on 12 June 2010 |
| | Commonwealth of Nations | Knight of Justice of the Order of St John | Appointed Officer (OStJ) in 1991; Appointed Commander (CStJ) in 1997; Appointed Knight of Justice (KStJ) in 2008 |
| | United Kingdom | General Service Medal | With "NORTHERN IRELAND" clasp |
| | United Kingdom | South Atlantic Medal | With Rosette |
| | United Kingdom | Iraq Medal | 2004 |
| | United Kingdom | Queen Elizabeth II Golden Jubilee Medal | 6 February 2002 |
| | United Kingdom | Queen Elizabeth II Diamond Jubilee Medal | 6 February 2012 |
| | United Kingdom | Queen Elizabeth II Platinum Jubilee Medal | 6 February 2022 |
| | United Kingdom | King Charles III Coronation Medal | 6 May 2023 |
| | United Kingdom | Territorial Decoration | (TD) 2004 |
| | United Kingdom | Volunteer Reserves Service Medal | VR |
| | Commonwealth of Nations | Service Medal of the Order of St John | |
| | Jamaica | Governor-General's Medal in Silver | |
| | Antigua & Barbuda | 25th Anniversary of Independence Medal | |
| | St Lucia | 30th Anniversary of Independence Medal | |
| | Tuvalu | Medal of the Tuvalu Order of Merit | |
| | Sovereign Military Order of Malta | Cross of Merit with Swords Order Pro Merito Melitensi | |

As an Equerry to the Duke of Edinburgh (formerly the Earl of Wessex) since 2004, Bruce wears an aiguillette on his right shoulder while in military uniform, as well the Royal Cypher of the Duke of Edinburgh on his epaulettes. As a Deputy Lieutenant from 2012, he is entitled to use the post-nominal letters "DL" in perpetuity. He earned the Territorial Decoration (TD) in 2004. The medal was awarded retrospectively in 2026.

== See also ==
- Governor of Edinburgh Castle

== Publications ==
- Days of Majesty, (co-authored with Simon Welfare); Macmillan Publications, London (1993)
- Keepers of the Kingdom: The Ancient Offices of Britain (co-authored with Mark Cator and Julian Calder); Cassell Illustrated Publications, London (1999)
- The Oldest: In Celebration of Britain's Living History (co-authored with Julian Calder); Cassell Publications, London (2005)
- The Butler's Guide to Running the Home and Other Graces (foreword by Alastair Bruce and written by Stanley Ager and Fiona St. Aubyn); Biteback Publications, London (2012)

Military offices
| Preceded by Major General; Michael Riddell-Webster | Governor of Edinburgh Castle; 2019 – 2024 | Succeeded by Major General; Robert Bruce |
