= Fermanagh Light Infantry Militia =

Auxiliary unit of the British Army

Fermanagh Light Infantry Militia 3rd (Fermanagh Militia) Bn, Royal Inniskilling Fusiliers 4th (Extra Reserve) Bn, Royal Inniskilling Fusiliers
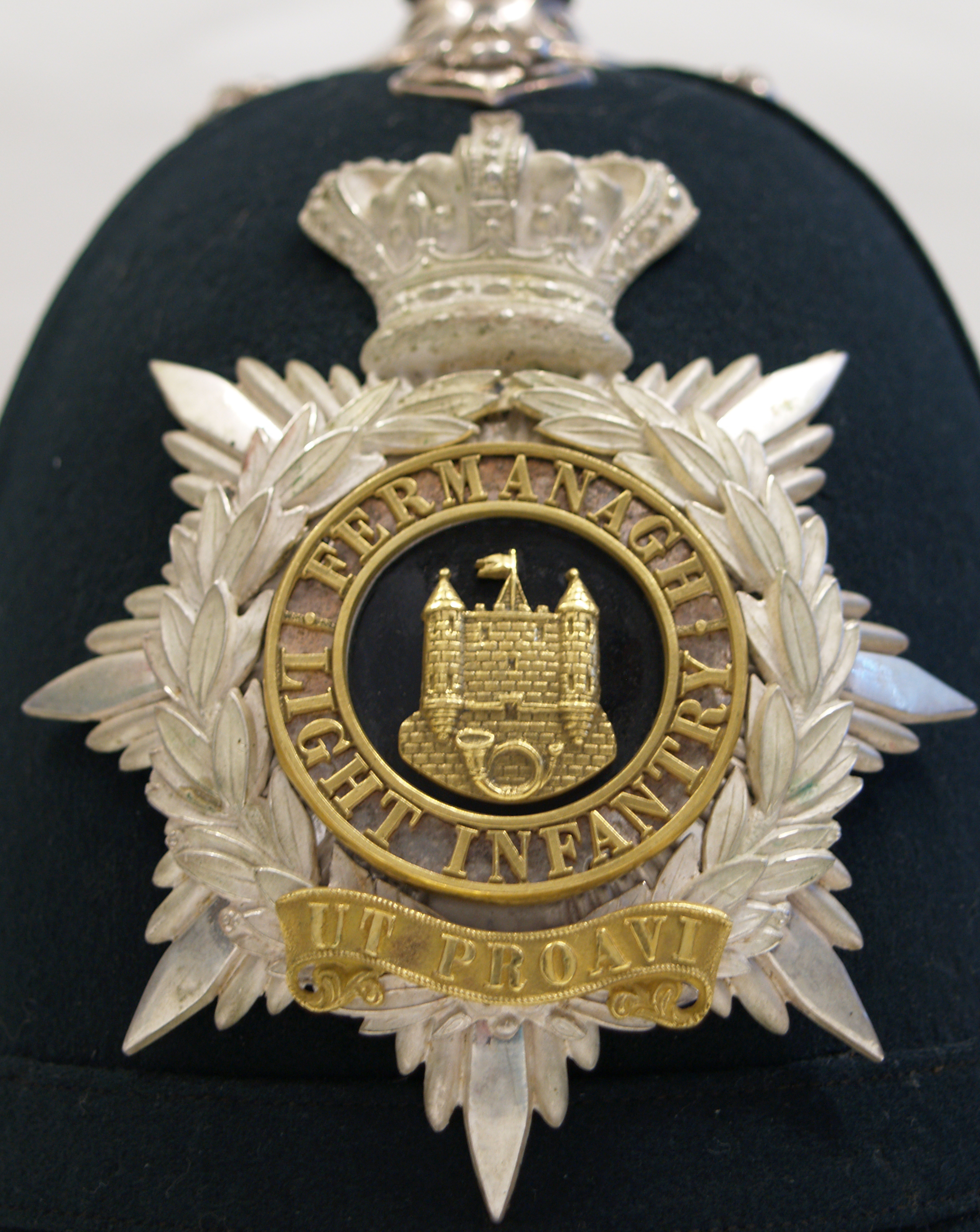
- Helmet Badge of the Fermanagh Light Infantry
- Active: 3 May 1793–1 April 1953
- Country: Ireland (1793–1800); United Kingdom (1801–1953)
- Branch: Militia/Special Reserve
- Role: Infantry
- Size: 1 Battalion
- Part of: Royal Inniskilling Fusiliers
- Garrison/HQ: Enniskillen
- Motto: Ut Proavi ('As our forefathers did')

The Fermanagh Militia, later the Fermanagh Light Infantry, was an Irish militia regiment raised in 1793 for home defence and internal security during the French Revolutionary and Napoleonic Wars. It also served during the Crimean War and Indian Mutiny. In 1881 it became a battalion of the Royal Inniskilling Fusiliers and was embodied in the Second Boer War. During World War I, as part of the Special Reserve, it trained thousands of reinforcements for battalions of that regiment serving overseas. Postwar it retained a shadowy existence until it was formally disbanded in 1953.

== Background ==
Although there are scattered references to town guards in 1584, no organised militia existed in Ireland before 1660. After that, some militia forces were organised in the reign of King Charles II and in the war between James II and William III, but it was not until 1715 that the Irish Militia came under statutory authority. During the 18th Century there were various Volunteer Associations and local militia units controlled by the landowners, concerned mainly with internal security. In 1778, during the War of American Independence, the threat of invasion by the Americans' allies, France and Spain, appeared to be serious. While most of the Regular Army was fighting overseas, the coasts of England and Wales were defended by the embodied Militia, but Ireland had no equivalent force. Under the leadership of George Ogle, the Parliament of Ireland passed a Militia Act. This failed to create an effective militia force but opened the way for the Irish Volunteers to fill the gap; even Ogle became a general in the Volunteers. The paramilitary Volunteers, however, were outside the control of either the parliament or the Dublin Castle administration. The invasion threat having receded, the Volunteers diminished in numbers but remained a political force. On the outbreak of the French Revolutionary War In 1793, the Irish administration passed an effective Militia Act that created an official Irish Militia, while the paramilitary volunteers were banned. The new Act was based on existing English precedents, with the men conscripted by ballot to fill county quotas (paid substitutes were permitted) and the officers having to meet certain property qualifications.

== Fermanagh Militia ==
Under the new Act County Fermanagh was given a quota of 356 men to raise as a battalion of 6 companies, and on 3 May the regiment was ordered to be formed at Enniskillen.

=== French Revolutionary War ===
The first task for the Governor of Fermanagh was to appoint the adjutant, non-commissioned officers (NCOs) and drummers, before the balloted men could be assembled; in most Irish militia units a proportion of these were experienced men obtained from the Regular Army. Initially there was some difficulty in providing arms for the new regiments, and many were bought second-hand. In September a detachment of the battalion formed part of a 400-strong force including some Regular cavalry, infantry, and artillery, sent to prevent a planned review of the illegal Volunteers at a village outside Belfast. The force quietly marched out to the site at 05.00 without beat of drums, and the review did not then take place.

To prevent the militia from being influenced by their friends and neighbours, the regiments were moved around the country. By the end of August 1794 the Fermanagh Militia was quartered at Newry. In February 1794 the regiments were each ordered to form a 24-man detachment to man the light cannon issued as 'battalion guns'. These detachments were trained at central 'schools of instruction'. Early in 1795 the Irish government ordered an augmentation of the militia from 1 April; the establishment of the Fermanagh Militia was increased to 460 rank and file. The additional men were to be found by voluntary enlistment where possible. In that year the practice of gathering the militia into summer training camps began. In July the Fermanagh Militia was in camp at Lehaunstown when it was ordered to send a party to disperse an illegal gathering in County Kildare.

Anxiety about a possible French invasion grew during the autumn of 1796 and preparations were made for field operations. A large French expeditionary force appeared in Bantry Bay on 21 December and troops from all over Ireland were marched towards the threatened area. However, the French fleet was scattered by winter storms, several ships being wrecked, and none of the French troops succeeded in landing; there was no sign of a rising by the United Irishmen. The invasion was called off on 29 December, and the troop concentration was dispersed in early 1797. At the same time the Light companies were detached to join composite battalions drawn from several militia regiments; the Fermanagh company joined the 2nd Light Battalion. When the militiamen of 1793 reached the end of their four-year enlistment in 1797, most of the Irish regiments were able to maintain their numbers through re-enlistments (for a bounty). At the time of the Irish Rebellion of 1798 the strength of the militia was boosted by re-enlistments and recruiting for bounty rather than the ballot. There was a large concentration of troops, and much marching about the country in pursuit of insurgents, but the Fermanagh Militia was not among the regiments engaged at the Battle of Vinegar Hill.

By the end of 1801 peace negotiations with the French were progressing and recruiting and re-enlistment for the Irish Militia was stopped in October. The men received the new clothing they were due on 25 December, but the Treaty of Amiens was signed in March and the warrant for disembodying the regiments was issued in May 1802. The men were paid off, leaving only the permanent staff of NCOs and drummers under the adjutant.

=== Napoleonic Wars ===
The Peace of Amiens was short-lived, and preparations to re-embody the Irish Militia began in November 1802. By March 1803 most of the regiments had been ordered to enlist men, a process which was aided by the number of previous militiamen who re-enlisted: Fermanagh only had to offer a small bounty to get men, and did not have to resort to the ballot. Britain declared war on France on 18 May 1803 and the warrant to embody the Irish Militia was issued the next day. John Willoughby Cole, 2nd Earl of Enniskillen, was appointed Colonel of the Fermanagh Militia on 31 May. The light companies were once again detached to form composite light battalions, but these were discontinued in 1806.

Over the following years the regiment carried out garrison duties at various towns across Ireland, attended summer training camps, and reacted to various invasion scares, none of which materialised. It also provided recruits who volunteered to transfer to the Regular Army. In 1805 the militia establishment was raised (the Fermanagh by 180 additional rank and file) to allow for this.

Napoleon abdicated in April 1814 and with the end of the war most Irish Militia regiments marched back to their home counties and were disembodied. However, they were called out again during the brief Waterloo campaign and its aftermath. The order to stand down finally arrived early in 1816 and the Fermanagh Militia was disembodied on 3 April.

After Waterloo there was a long peace. Although officers continued to be commissioned into the militia and ballots might still held, the regiments were rarely assembled for training and the permanent staffs of militia regiments were progressively reduced. The Earl of Enniskillen resigned the command of the Fermanagh Militia in 1834 and his son William Willoughby Cole, Viscount Cole (later 3rd Earl) was appointed in his place.

== Fermanagh Light Infantry ==
The Militia of the United Kingdom was revived by the Militia Act 1852 (15 & 16 Vict. c. 50), enacted during a renewed period of international tension. As before, units were raised and administered on a county basis, and filled by voluntary enlistment (although conscription by means of the Militia Ballot might be used if the counties failed to meet their quotas). Training was for 56 days on enlistment, then for 21–28 days per year, during which the men received full army pay. Under the Act, Militia units could be embodied by Royal Proclamation for full-time home defence service in three circumstances:

1. 'Whenever a state of war exists between Her Majesty and any foreign power'.
2. 'In all cases of invasion or upon imminent danger thereof'.
3. 'In all cases of rebellion or insurrection'.

The Fermanagh Militia was revived at Enniskillen, becoming the Fermanagh Light Infantry in 1855. The position of colonel was abolished in the militia after the 1852 reforms, but the Earl of Enniskillen retained the command until 1875, when he became the regiments's first Honorary Colonel.

=== Crimean War & Indian Mutiny ===
War having broken out with Russia and an expeditionary force sent to the Crimea in 1854, the militia was called out to take over garrison and defence duties at home. The Fermanagh LI was embodied at Enniskillen by March 1855. It moved to Newry by October, and then to Dublin by March 1856. The Crimean War ended on 30 March 1856, and the Militia were stood down in May, by which time the Fermanagh LI was stationed at Curragh Camp.

When a large expeditionary force was sent to suppress the Indian Mutiny, many militia units were called out again, the Fermanagh LI being embodied at Enniskillen by December 1857. It was shipped to England and stationed at Aldershot Camp in February–March 1858, before moving to Great Yarmouth in April. In September it moved to Bradford and Burnley, then to Chester in May 1859. It went back to Bradford and Burnley by September, before returning to Chester by December where it remained until May 1860; it then it moved to Manchester. By August 1860 it was back in Ireland, at Dublin, returning to Ennikillen by September, where it was disembodied.

The Militia thereafter carried out their annual training obligations, but during the Fenian Rising of 1867 the recruitment and annual training of the Irish Militia were suspended until 1871. When training was resumed the Fermanagh LI was brigaded with the Royal Tyrone Fusiliers from Omagh for exercises.

The Militia Reserve introduced in 1867 consisted of present and former militiamen across the UK who undertook to serve overseas in case of war. From 1871 The militia came under the War Office rather than their counties and by now the battalions had a large cadre of permanent staff (about 30). Around a third of the recruits and many young officers went on to join the regular army.

=== Cardwell Reforms ===
Under the 'Localisation of the Forces' scheme introduced by the Cardwell Reforms of 1872, militia regiments were brigaded with their local linked regular regiments. For the Royal Tyrone Fusiliers this was with the 27th (Inniskilling) and 108th (Madras Infantry) Regiments of Foot in Sub-District No 64 (Counties of Londonderry, Donegal, Tyrone and Fermanagh) in Belfast District of Irish Command:

- 27th (Inniskilling) Regiment
- 108th (Madras Infantry) Regiment of Foot
- Fermanagh Light Infantry
- Londonderry Light Infantry
- Royal Tyrone Fusiliers
- Prince of Wales's Own Donegal Militia
- Brigade Depot at Omagh

Although often referred to as brigades, the sub-districts were purely administrative organisations, but in a continuation of the Cardwell Reforms a mobilisation scheme began to appear in the Army List from December 1875. This assigned Regular and Militia units to places in an order of battle of corps, divisions and brigades for the 'Active Army', even though these formations were entirely theoretical, with no staff or services assigned. The Fermanagh LI was assigned as 'Divisional Troops' to 3rd Division, VIII Corps in Scotland. The division would have mustered at Melrose in time of war.

== Royal Inniskilling Fusiliers ==
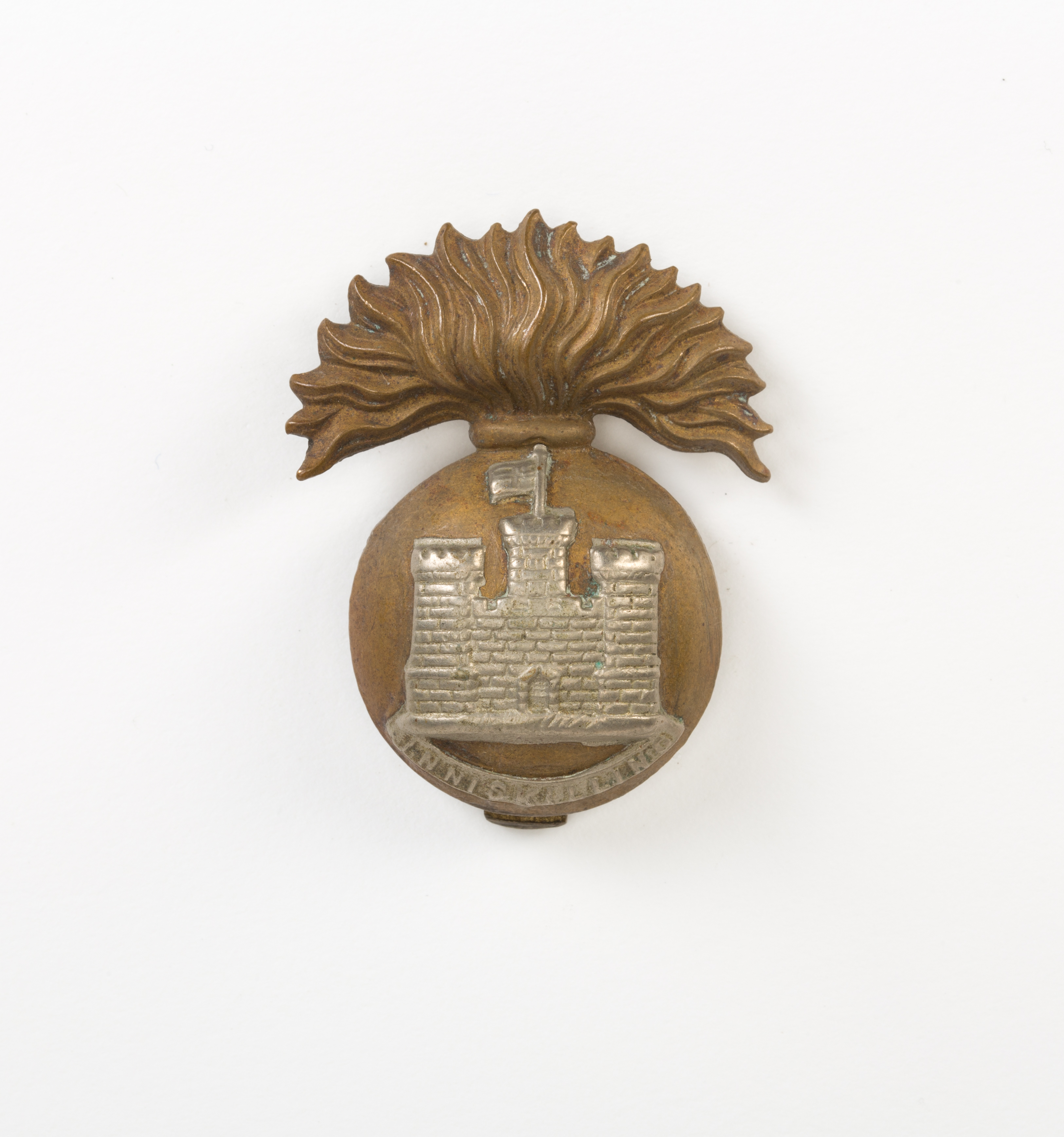
Royal Inniskilling Fusiliers' cap badge used until 1916.

The Childers Reforms took Cardwell's reforms further, with the linked battalions forming single regiments. From 1 July 1881 the 27th and 108th Regiments became the 1st and 2nd Battalions of the Royal Inniskilling Fusiliers, and the militia battalions followed in numerical sequence. The Fermanagh Light Infantry became the 3rd (Fermanagh Militia) Battalion, Royal Inniskilling Fusiliers.

=== Second Boer War ===
After the disasters of Black Week at the start of the Second Boer War in December 1899, most of the regular army was sent to South Africa, the Militia Reserve was mobilised, and many militia units were called out for home defence. The 3rd Inniskillings were embodied from 5 December 1899 to 16 October 1900. The battalion's commanding officer, Lt-Col Hugh Houghton Stuart, a former officer in the Royal Irish Rifles, served in South Africa, commanding 22nd (Rough Riders) Battalion, Imperial Yeomanry and 3rd (Militia) Bn Essex Regiment.

== Special Reserve ==
After the Boer War, the future of the Militia was called into question. There were moves to reform the Auxiliary Forces (Militia, Yeomanry and Volunteer Force) to take their place in the six Army Corps proposed by the Secretary of State for War, St John Brodrick. However, little of Brodrick's scheme was carried out. Under the more sweeping Haldane Reforms of 1908, the Militia was replaced by the Special Reserve (SR), a semi-professional force whose role was to provide reinforcement drafts for regular units serving overseas in wartime, rather like the earlier Militia Reserve. On 12 July 1908 the Fermanagh Militia became the 4th (Extra Reserve) Battalion, Royal Inniskilling Fusiliers.

=== World War I ===
On the outbreak of World War I the battalion was embodied at Ennisillen on 4 August 1914 under the command of Lt-Col Harold Kinsman and went to its war station at Fort Dunree on Lough Swilly. In October it was moved into Ludden Camp at Buncrana. Here the battalion fulfilled its role of preparing reinforcement drafts of Reservists and Special Reservists, and later of fresh recruits, to the regular battalions of the Inniskillings (the 1st at Gallipoli and later on the Western Front, the 2nd on the Western Front throughout the war). In 1916 the battalion spent some time at Clonmany, but later returned to Buncrana.

After Lord Kitchener issued his call for volunteers in August 1914, the battalions of the 1st New Army ('K1' of 'Kitchener's Army') were quickly formed at the regimental depots. K2 and K3 followed shortly afterwards, and the depots struggled to cope with the influx of volunteers (the Inniskillings formed two battalions each for K1 and K2). The SR battalions also swelled with new recruits and were soon well above their establishment strength. On 8 October 1914 each SR battalion was ordered to use the surplus to form a service battalion for the 4th New Army ('K4'): 4th (Extra Reserve) Bn was to form 13th (Service) Battalion. However, this instruction was cancelled on 25 October after the Inniskillings took over three ready-made battalions from the prewar paramilitary Ulster Volunteer Force in place of further Kitchener battalions. The 13th (Service) Bn was finally formed in 1918 from a garrison battalion in France.

About April 1918 the 4th (Extra Reserve) Bn was absorbed by the 3rd (Reserve) Bn of the Inniskillings (the former Royal Tyrone Fusiliers). In April the merged battalion moved to Oswestry in Shropshire, England, where it remained for the rest of the war as part of the West Lancashire Reserve Brigade.

The battalion's former CO, Sir Hugh Houghton Stewart, came out of retirement and commanded 77th Brigade in 26th Division (a Kitchener division) from 25 October 1914 until 29 October 1915, after it embarked for overseas service.

=== Postwar ===
The SR resumed its old title of Militia in 1921 but like most militia units the 4th Inniskillings remained in abeyance after World War I. By the outbreak of World War II in 1939, no officers remained listed for the 4th Bn. The Militia was formally disbanded in April 1953.

== Commanders ==
Colonels of the Regiment included:

- John Willoughby Cole, 2nd Earl of Enniskillen, appointed 31 May 1803
- William Willoughby Cole, 3rd Earl of Enniskillen, son of above, appointed 24 October 1834

Lieutenants-Colonel (Commanding Officer from 1875) included:

- Richard Magennis, appointed 23 July 1803
- Samuel Crichton, former major, Inniskilling Dragoons, promoted 18 July 1855
- Edward Archdale, former captain, 14th Foot, appointed 12 May 1862
- John Gerard Irvine, promoted 9 October 1875
- Sir Fenton Josiah Hort, 5th Baronet of Castle Strange, promoted 22 May 1889
- W.B. Neville, promoted 6 June 1892
- Sir Hugh Houghton Stewart, 4th Baronet of Athenree, former captain, Royal Irish Rifles, appointed 22 September 1897
- Harold John Kinsman, retired captain, Royal Dublin Fusiliers, appointed 12 September 1913

Honorary Colonels:

- William Cole, 3rd Earl of Enniskillen, former CO, appointed 20 November 1875, died 19 November 1886
- Lowry Egerton Cole, 4th Earl of Enniskillen, former lieutenant, Rifle Brigade, appointed 8 January 1887, died 28 April 1924

Other prominent members:

- John Crichton, 4th Earl Erne (as Viscount Crichton), appointed captain 12 May 1862
- Sir Richard Gethin, 6th Baronet, appointed lieutenant 22 December 1858

== Heritage and ceremonial ==
=== Precedence ===
During the American War of Independence the lords-lieutenant of the English and Welsh counties had drawn lots each year to determine the relative precedence of their militia regiments. On 2 March 1793, at the outbreak of the French Revolutionary War, they drew lots again, but this time the order of precedence held good for the whole war. The Irish counties did the same on 8 August 1793 for their newly raised militia regiments: Fermanagh was 29th. The English, Welsh and Scottish counties re-balloted at the beginning of the Napoleonic War, but the Irish counties apparently retained the previous order.

In 1833 King William IV drew lots, by individual regiments, for all the militia of the United Kingdom: the Fermanagh Militia came 71st. This precedence was retained until the Cardwell Reforms. Most regiments paid little attention to the number.

=== Uniforms ===
The Fermanagh Militia wore the standard infantry uniform in red. From at least 1850 the facings were buff, as were those of the 27th Foot. The badge on the 1880 Home Service helmet (below) features a light infantry bugle-horn superimposed on Enniskillen Castle. The motto Ut proavi ('As our forefathers did') is an abbreviation of the motto of Enniskillen Ut proavi in Deo confidemus ('Let us trust in God as our forefathers did'). In 1881 the combined regiment adopted the blue facings appropriate to a 'Royal' regiment and the 'bomb' badge of a fusilier regiment, with the castle on the ball.

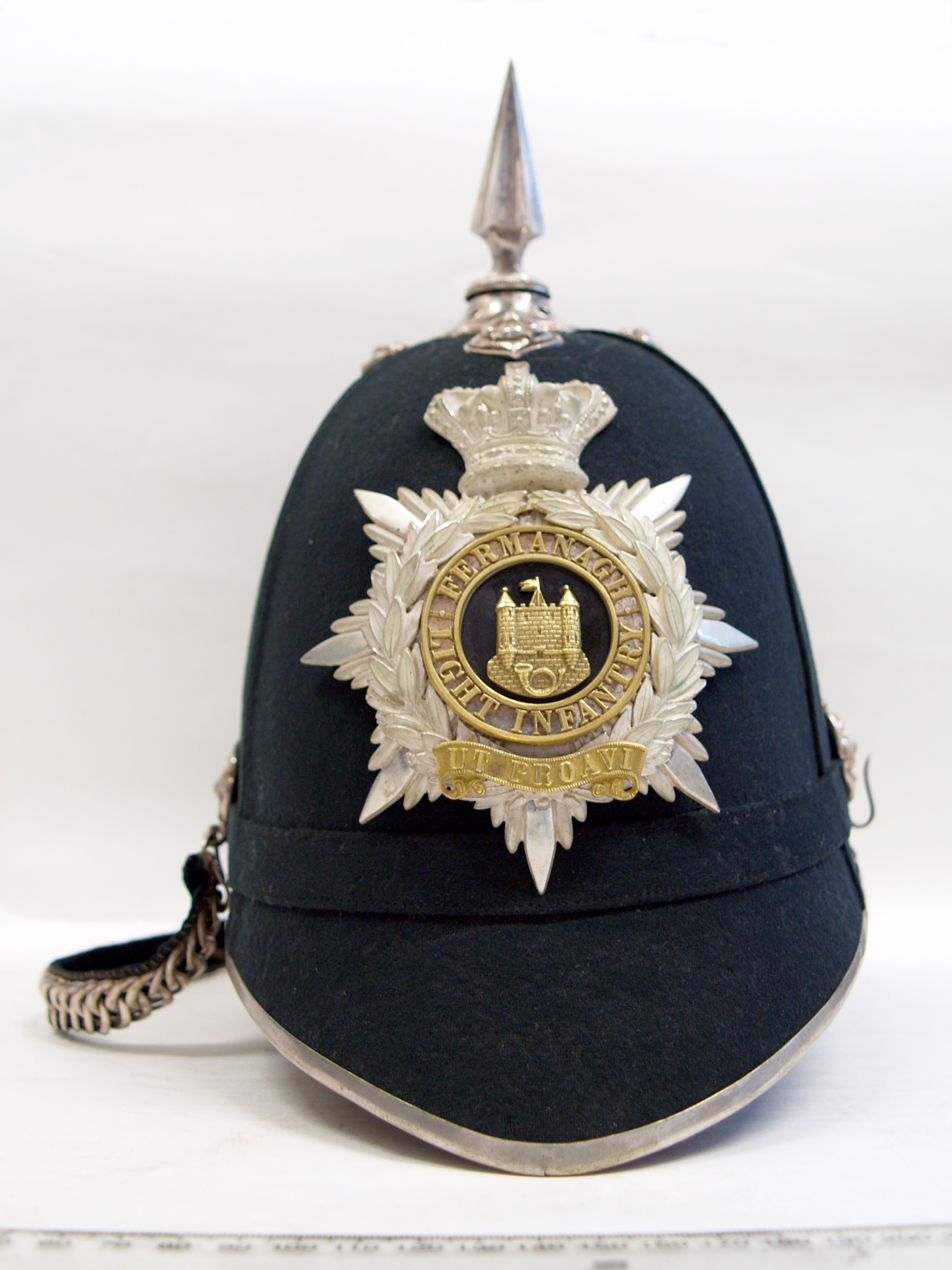
Officer's Home Service Helmet ca 1880

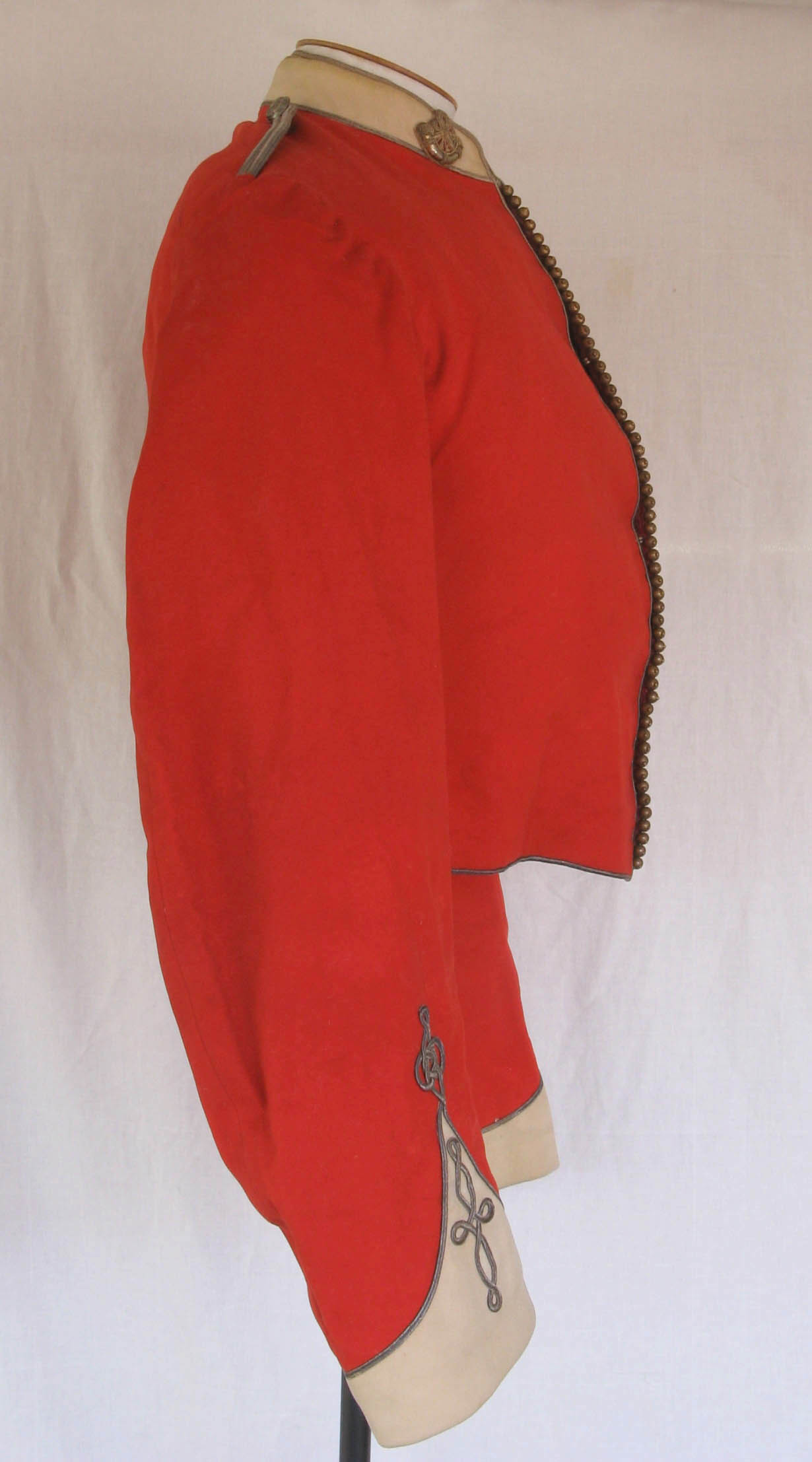
Officer's full dress tunic ca 1880

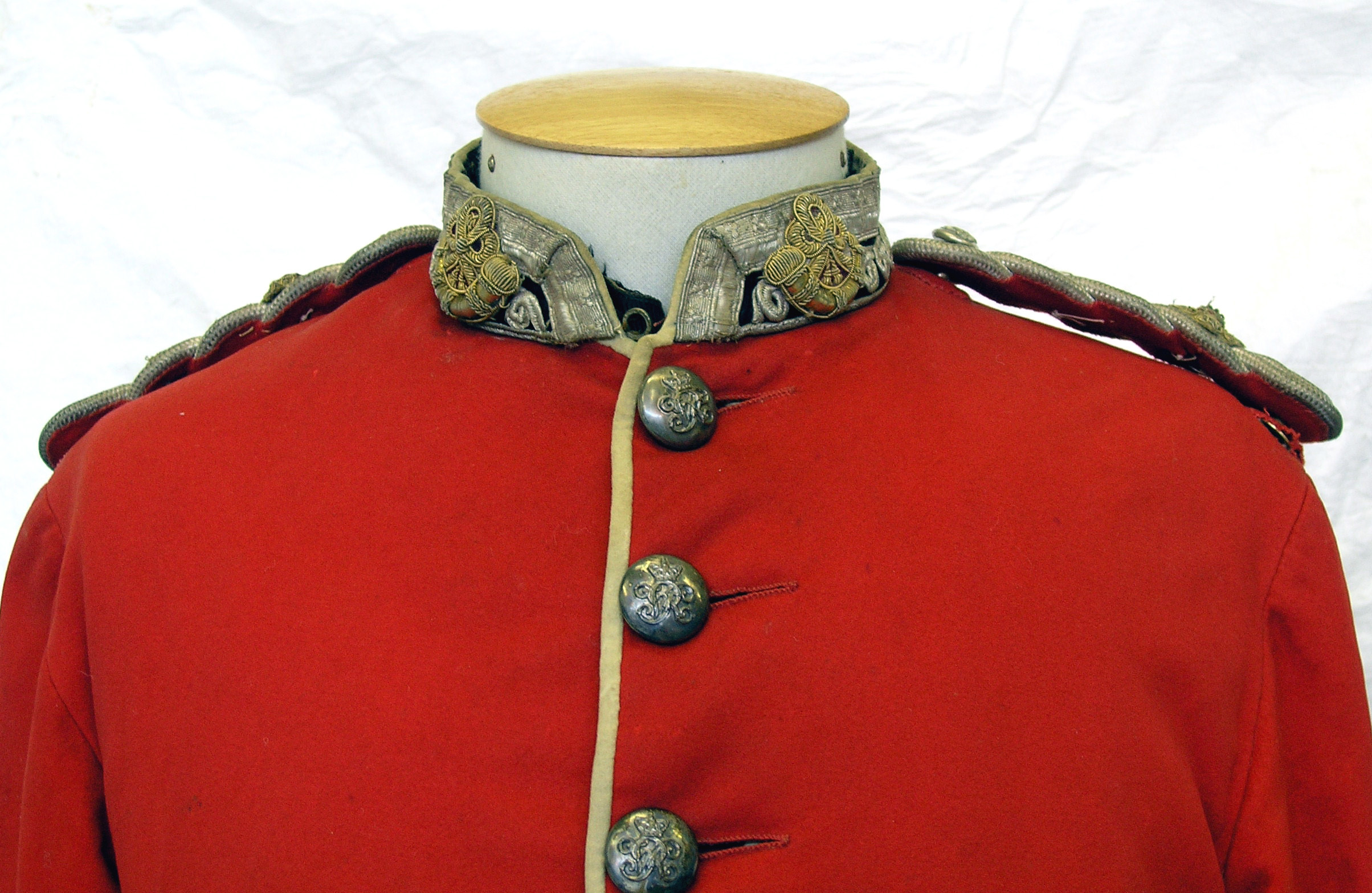
Officer's shell jacket ca 1880

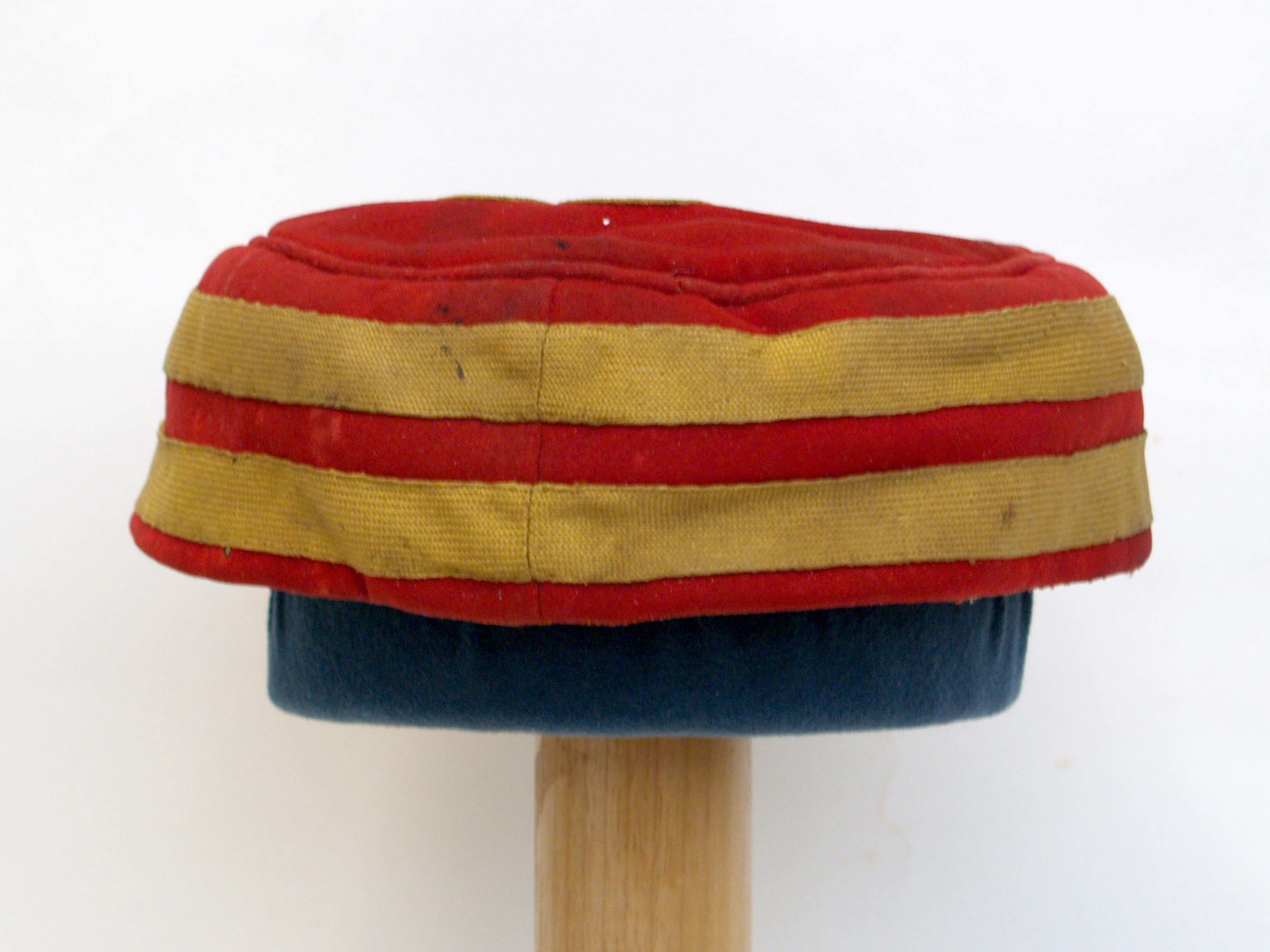
Officer's forage cap ca 1880

== See also ==
- Irish Militia
- Militia (United Kingdom)
- Special Reserve
- Royal Inniskilling Fusiliers
