= 15 Psychological Operations Group =

Former British Army unit

15 (UK) Psychological Operations Group
- Active: 1991–2015
- Allegiance: United Kingdom
- Branch: British Army
- Role: Psychological warfare
- Size: ~ 150 personnel
- Garrison/HQ: Denison Barracks, Berkshire

15 (United Kingdom) Psychological Operations Group was a tri-service, or "purple", military unit formerly parented by 1 Military Intelligence Brigade but from April 2014, part of the Security Assistance Group within the British Army's Force Troops Command. Since April 2015, it has been subsumed into 77th Brigade within 6th (United Kingdom) Division.

== History ==
Following the Gulf War of 1991, the UK formed a shadow PSYOPS unit called 15 (UK) PSYOPS Group (Shadow). A double digit prefix was selected to avoid any confusion with the U.S counterparts of the 2nd, 4th, 7th, and 8th MIS/Psych Ops Groups, and the number 15 was chosen because PSYOPS battlefield activities in support of 21 Army Group during WW2 were conducted by Amplifier Units (numbered 10-14). The Group adopted the stag's head formation sign used by the World War II Indian Field Broadcast Units (IFBU). Reputedly the deer's antlers symbolize both the combat support function of PSYOPS and the antennae associated with a major means of dissemination of psychological warfare messages.

15 (UK) Psychological Operations Group was established immediately after the 1991 Gulf War when the success of US military psychological operations convinced the Ministry of Defence that the UK required a similar capability. Initially, it was composed of just a single desk officer with the intention that it would be augmented by additional personnel when required. As such, the group was referred to in military terminology as a 'shadow' unit. Subsequently, conspiracy theorists have suggested incorrectly that 'shadow' was a covert code name for the group and members of the group have been targeted in the press. During the 1990s, for a short period, the name was altered to 15 Information Operations Group (Info Ops) - it being deemed a more generic term suited to its role within the UK's newly formed Information Operations umbrella group which included Media Ops.

Since 1991, the group expanded significantly in size to meet operational requirements and participated in every major UK military operation since that period. The Black and White Association (formerly club) is the regimental association for the group and for the first time, in 2013, members paraded on Remembrance Sunday at the Cenotaph. Leading members of the Black and White Association include Colonel Colin Mason (ret'd), Tony Rowlands (former Foreign Office official), Commander Steve Tatham RN, and the UK's former two-star Director of Defence Communications, Stephen Jolly.

In October 2012, the group was awarded the Firmin Sword of Peace for its "valuable contribution to humanitarian activities by establishing good and friendly relations with the inhabitants of any community at home or overseas". The citation noted that:

A small team from 15 POG has been continuously deployed to Helmand for six years. Working predominantly with the Afghan civilian population, it has sought to inform, reassure, educate and through the promotion of free and unbiased discussion persuade Afghans that their futures are best served not with the Taliban, nor with ISAF, but with themselves and their elected government. The unit runs a network of radio stations employing local Afghans as DJs, broadcasting music, poetry, debate programmes and even a Helmandi soap opera, as well as producing graphical posters and leaflets to communicate in an area where literacy rates are only around 20%. Recent projects include information campaigns to prevent children picking up spent ordnance they find, disseminating information from farming and veterinary workshops using their radio stations, and promoting debate on political issues of the day.

The sword was presented to the group's then commanding officer, Commander Steve Tatham RN at a ceremony in London by the Chief of Defence Staff General Sir David Richards. The award was covered by the BBC which was granted exclusive access to the group.

The group's honorary colonel Lieutenant General Sir Paul Newton, formerly Commander of Force Development and Training for the British Army, stepped down in 2014. In 2016, 15 (UK) Psychological Operations Group was moved from Chicksands to Denison Barracks, Hermitage, Berkshire, where it was integrated into 77th Brigade, formerly the Security Assistance Group.

== Role ==
15 (UK) Psychological Operations Group had over 150 personnel under its command, approximately 75 from the regular Armed Forces and 75 from the Reserves. The Group supported deployed commanders in the provision of psychological operations in operational and tactical environments.
