= Michael Riddell-Webster =

Major General Michael Riddell-Webster CB DSO
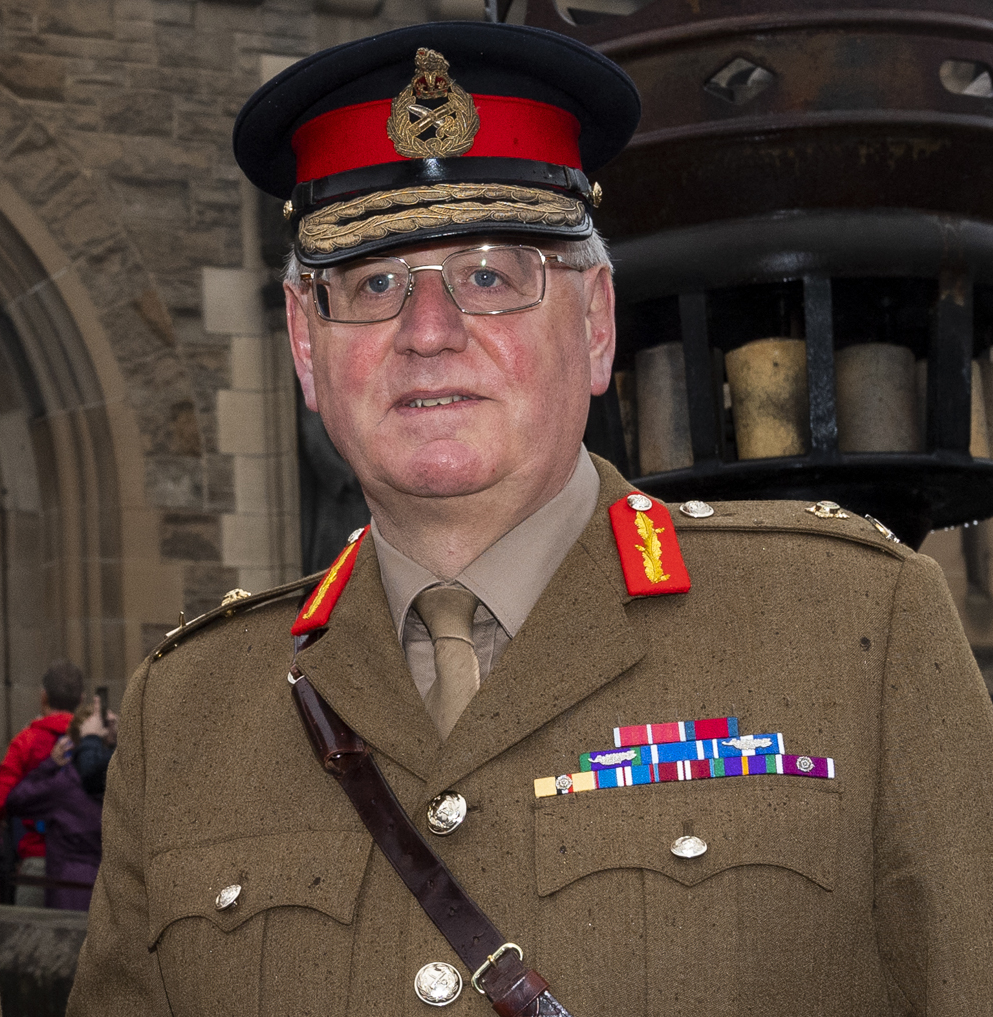
- Riddell-Webster in 2019
- Born: December 1960 (age 65)
- Military career
- Allegiance: United Kingdom
- Branch: British Army
- Service years: 1983–2014
- Rank: Major General
- Commands: 39th Infantry Brigade; 1st Battalion Black Watch
- Conflicts: The Troubles; Iraq War
- Awards: Commander of the Order of the British Empire; Distinguished Service Order; Queen's Commendation for Valuable Service (2)

Major General Michael Lawrence Riddell-Webster, CBE, DSO (born December 1960) is a retired British Army officer. He served as Governor of Edinburgh Castle from 2015 to 2019.

== Early life and education ==
Riddell-Webster was born in December 1960. He was educated at Harrow School, an all-boys private boarding school in London. He studied for a Master of Science (MSc) degree in energy at Heriot-Watt University.

== Military career ==
Riddell-Webster was commissioned into the Black Watch in 1983. After serving in the Former Republic of Yugoslavia, for which he was awarded the Queen's Commendation for Valuable Service in 2001, he became commanding officer of 1st Battalion the Black Watch in December 2000 and commanded it during the Iraq War in 2003, for which he was awarded the Distinguished Service Order.

Riddell-Webster went on to be Deputy Director Equipment Capability (Ground Manoeuvre) at the Ministry of Defence in October 2003 and commander of the 39th Infantry Brigade in Northern Ireland in December 2005, for which he was also awarded the Queen's Commendation for Valuable Service in 2007. After that he became Director of the Army Division at the Joint Services Command and Staff College in September 2007, Head of Capability (Ground Manoeuvre) at the Ministry of Defence in December 2008, and Director of the Defence College of Management and Technology in January 2012.

After retiring from the Regular Army in September 2014, he joined the Army Reserve. He became Governor of Edinburgh Castle in October 2015. He handed the Castle over to its next governor, Major General Alastair Bruce of Crionaich, on 24 June 2019.
