= Royal School of Military Survey =

Coordinates: 51°27.13′N 1°17.05′W

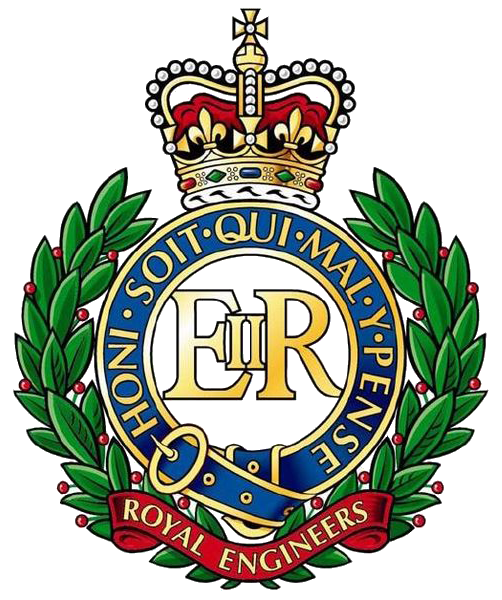
- Badge of the Royal Engineers
- Active: 1833 – Present
- Country: United Kingdom
- Branch: British Army
- Type: Training
- Role: Engineer Training
- Part of: Army Recruiting and Training Division
- Garrison/HQ: Denison Barracks, Hermitage, Berkshire.

Royal School of Military Survey (DCI RSMS) is a joint services survey training facility associated with the Corps of Royal Engineers (RE) but attached to the United Kingdom Defence Intelligence and Security Centre (DISC).

== History ==
The Royal School of Military Survey (RSMS) originates from 1833 when it was established at the Royal Military Academy, Woolwich as a survey training branch. After a period of stability the school moved to a number of locations including Chatham, Fort Southwick, Ruabon and Longleat before finally settling at Hermitage, Berkshire in early 1949, when it was renamed the School of Military Survey. The Hermitage site (strictly speaking it is in Curridge) was home to 42 Survey Engineer Group (Royal Engineers) and maintained close links with the Survey Production Centres (Royal Engineers), abbreviated as SPC(RE), at Bushy Park, Teddington and Park Royal (which amalgamated at Feltham in the 1960s and went through changes of name to Mapping and Charting Establishment (Royal Engineers) - MCE(RE) - in the 1970s before becoming part of Military Survey, later absorbed into The Intelligence Collection Group (ICG). In 1979 a major rebuild at Hermitage provided the school with purpose-built facilities. As part of Military Survey’s 250th Anniversary celebrations in 1997, Her Majesty Queen Elizabeth II awarded the school the Royal accolade. In April 2006 the RSMS became one of four federated schools within the Defence Intelligence and Security Centre (DISC) along with the Defence Schools of Intelligence (DSI), Languages (DSL) and Photography (DSOP). To exploit the growing synergies between Geoinformatics and Imagery Intelligence (IMINT) all Geospatial and Imagery analysis training and education is now the responsibility of RSMS. The school consists of three Training Wings: Geospatial Information Management and Geospatial Exploitation, based at Hermitage, and Imagery Intelligence, based at Chicksands in Bedfordshire.

== Courses ==
Courses taught at RSMS range in duration from three days to 14 months. Geospatial education and training for Royal Engineer (RE) Geographic Officers, Defence personnel, and international students is provided through the MSc in Defence Geographic Information awarded by Cranfield University since 1993. From August 2009, this course has been developed into an MSc in Geospatial Intelligence to provide opportunities for Defence personnel to achieve an MSc through a variety of delivery modes including full-time at Hermitage, part-time, and distance learning. The change was in keeping with the evolution of defence survey and was very little more than a name change. The premier course offered by RSMS is the 14 month resident Army Survey Course (ASC). The ASC is designed to be a demanding program focusing on the various fields pertaining to geospatial information and its application within the defence community. Successful completion of the ASC results in the conferment of an MSc in Geospatial Intelligence from Cranfield University. In this relationship RSMS is responsible for course content, while Cranfield University is involved with oversight and program accreditation. Cranfield University and RSMS faculty meet regularly to ensure that each student is attaining the high standards required for graduation. Fully successful students graduate from Cranfield Defence and Security (CDS), based at Shrivenham, Oxfordshire, during the July following the course.

Trade training for RE Geographic Technicians is recognised through a Foundation Degree in Applied Computing (Defence Geographic Information) accredited by Sheffield Hallam University (SHU). A recent development has been the addition of a bachelor's degree in partnership with SHU to provide RE Geographic Technicians with the opportunity to further develop their technical and academic competencies. In addition to the accredited courses, RSMS also delivers a range of specialist courses to Defence personnel, including Imagery Analysis, Full Motion Video Interpretation, GPS, Map Reading, Land Navigation, Geographic Information Systems and Terrain Analysis. The school is based at Denison Barracks in Hermitage, Royal County of Berkshire.
