= Paul Newton (British Army officer) =

British Army general

Lieutenant General Sir Paul Newton KBE
- Allegiance: United Kingdom
- Branch: British Army
- Service years: 1975–2012
- Rank: Lieutenant General
- Commands: 2 Bn Princess of Wales’s Royal Regiment; 8th Infantry Brigade
- Conflicts: The Troubles; Iraq War
- Awards: Knight Commander of the Order of the British Empire; Officer of the Legion of Merit (United States); Commander 1st Class of the Order of the Dannebrog (Denmark)

Lieutenant General Sir Paul Raymond Newton KBE is a former British Army officer and Director of Exeter University's Strategy and Security Institute. Prior to leaving the army he was Commander Force Development and Training.

== Military career ==
Educated at Sandhurst and later at Cambridge University, Newton was commissioned into the Royal Hampshire Regiment in 1975. He earned promotion to lieutenant two years later. He was promoted to the rank of captain in the Royal Hampshire Regiment in 1981 and to major in 1988 seeing service as a company commander. Promoted to lieutenant colonel in 1994, he was given command of the 2nd Battalion The Princess of Wales’s Royal Regiment (2PWRR) in Northern Ireland.

Promoted to colonel in 1998, Newton attended the Higher Command and Staff Course at the Joint Services Command and Staff College in 1999 and then joined Permanent Joint Headquarters at Northwood where he undertook planning for the British response to the Kosovo War. He later commanded Brunei Garrison where he undertook planning for operations in East Timor.

Promoted to brigadier in 2000, Newton became Commander of 8th Infantry Brigade in December 2000 and again saw service in Northern Ireland for which he was appointed Commander of the Order of the British Empire. After attending the Royal College of Defence Studies, he became Chief of Defence Staff's Liaison Officer to the Chairman of the US Joint Chiefs in Washington, working on Iraq, in 2003. He was deployed as the Deputy, Strategic Planning in HQ Multi-National Force Iraq in September 2004 for which he was awarded the US Legion of Merit.

Newton was appointed Assistant Chief of Staff (Intelligence) at Permanent Joint Headquarters in January 2005. Promoted to major-general in February 2006, he became Chief Army Instructor at the Royal College of Defence Studies on promotion. He returned to Iraq in early 2007 to lead reconciliation efforts, for which he was awarded the American Legion of Merit, First Oak Leaf Cluster. He became Assistant Chief of Defence Staff (Developments, Concepts and Doctrine) in January 2008 and was appointed Commander Force Development and Training with the rank of lieutenant general in April 2010. He left the Army in February 2012.

He served as Colonel Commandant of the Queen's Division and of Honorary Colonel of 15 Psychological Operations Group.

== Academia ==
On 17 March 2012, Newton became the chair in security and strategy studies at the University of Exeter and director of the University's new Strategy and Security Institute. Recently appointed a senior associate fellow at RUSI, he has co-edited and contributed to 'After the Spring: Prospects for the Arab World in 2013, UNA-UK', published in December 2012 and wrote a chapter entitled 'Adapt or Fail: The Challenge for the Armed Forces after Blair’s Wars' for Professor Sir Hew Strachan's book, 'Blair’s Wars' published in June 2013.

He was appointed Knight Commander of the Order of the British Empire (KBE) in the 2012 Birthday Honours.

Military offices
Preceded by Bill Rollo	Commander Force Development and Training; 2010–2012	Succeeded by Jacko Page
