= Commander Force Development and Capability =

Former senior British Army appointment, responsible for training

The Commander Force Development and Capability was a senior (3 star) British Army officer with responsibility for training the Army, and developing its capability, sustainability and doctrine. The post of Commander Force Development and Training was first established in December 2009. Following a further organisational review, the appointment became Commander Force Development and Capability on 1 April 2014, losing responsibility for recruiting and initial training. This post no longer exists as of 2015.

== Commanders ==
Commanders have included:

- 2009-2010 Lieutenant-General Bill Rollo
- 2010-2012 Lieutenant-General Paul Newton
- 2012-2014 Lieutenant-General Jonathan Page
- 2014-2015 Lieutenant-General Mark Poffley
