= Mark Poffley =

British Army officer (born 1960)

Lieutenant General Sir Mark Poffley KCB OBE
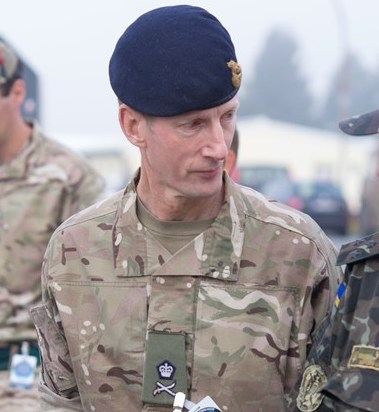
- Poffley in 2014
- Born: 1960 (age 65–66)
- Military career
- Allegiance: United Kingdom
- Branch: British Army
- Service years: 1985–2019
- Rank: Lieutenant General
- Service number: 521134
- Unit: Royal Army Ordnance Corps
- Commands: 102nd Logistic Brigade; 13 Air Assault Support Regiment
- Conflicts: Gulf War; Bosnian War; Insurgency in the Republic of Macedonia; War in Afghanistan; Iraq War
- Awards: Knight Commander of the Order of the Bath; Officer of the Order of the British Empire; Queen's Commendation for Valuable Service

Lieutenant General Sir Mark William Poffley, KCB, OBE (born 1960) is a former senior British Army officer and an active director of Universal Defence and Security Solutions.

== Military career ==
Poffley was commissioned into the Royal Army Ordnance Corps in 1985. After seeing action in the Gulf War and then in the Bosnian War, he served as Deputy Chief of Staff for 24 Airmobile Brigade and then as Staff Officer responsible for Plans and Doctrine in the Attack Helicopter Team. He became commanding officer of 13 Air Assault Support Regiment in 2001, and was deployed to Macedonia in August of that year and Afghanistan in 2002.

Poffley went on to be Colonel Army Plans in 2003 and commander 102nd Logistic Brigade in 2005, seeing active service in Iraq in that capacity. He went on to be Principal Staff Officer to the Chief of the Defence Staff in December 2006, Chief of Staff Land Forces in March 2009 and Assistant Chief of the Defence Staff (Resources and Plans) in November 2011: he was given the additional title of Master General of Logistics in June 2012. Promoted to lieutenant general, Poffley went on to be Commander Force Development and Capability in February 2014 as well as the Deputy Chief of the General Staff in Spring 2015. After that he was appointed Deputy Chief of Defence Staff (Military Capability) at the Ministry of Defence in January 2016. In the 2018 Queen's Birthday Honours, he was appointed Knight Commander of the Order of the Bath (KCB).

Military offices
Preceded by Jacko Page	Commander Force Development and Capability; 2014–2015	Post disbanded
New title	Deputy Chief of the General Staff; 2015	Succeeded by Nick Pope
Preceded by Stephen Hillier	Deputy Chief of the Defence Staff (Capability); 2016–2018	Succeeded by Rich Knighton
