= Poughley Priory =

Priory in Chaddleworth, Berkshire, England

Coordinates: 51.47888°N 1.40166°W

Poughley Priory was a priory of Austin Canons at Chaddleworth in the English county of Berkshire, located between Great Shefford and Leckhampstead.

It was established around 1160 and dissolved in 1525.

== History ==
A charter of inspection and confirmation of the year 1330 gives an authoritative account of the origin of Poughley Priory. It was founded by Ralph de Chaddleworth, about the year 1160, who endowed it with the site of a hermitage called "Clenfordemere" or "Ellenfordemere", with an adjacent wood, and with the church of Chaddleworth, including the chapel of Wulney (Wolley) and all its appurtenances. At the same time or shortly afterwards the priory received from Thomas de Mazuy the land that he held at West Batterton, Wiltshire; from Roger de Curridge, his lands at Curridge; from Nicholas de Hedinton, his lands at Peasemore; from Lambert de Faringdon, his lands at Faringdon; and from Hugh de Bathonia, his lands at "Werdeham" and his meadow at Colthrop. The same confirmation charter also briefly recites a number of later small donations, chiefly of plots of land in Berkshire.

This priory, erected on the site of the old hermitage and dedicated to the honour of St. Margaret, was assigned to canons regular of the order of St. Augustine.

Pope Alexander in 1182 granted to the newly founded house entire exemption from tithes, and further ordered by his apostolic authority both the bishop of Salisbury and the archdeacon of Berkshire and their officials not to impose any new charges of any kind on the priory. In this bull of papal protection, the house is described as the priory of St. Margaret of "Elenfordesmer".

Pope Alexander IV granted two bulls to this house in September 1256. By the first of these, dated 22 September, the privilege was conferred of celebrating the divine offices in a low tone (voce supressa) and with closed doors and without ringing of bells, during interdicts. By the second, dated five days later, the priory was taken, in general terms, under apostolic protection.

The taxation roll of Pope Nicholas IV in 1291 names a pension of 2s. 6d. due to this priory from the church of West Hendred. Under the head of temporalities the annual sum of £14 19s. 4d. was due from lands in Belton, Lambourn, Peasemore, Speen and Marcham, all in the archdeaconry of Berkshire, and also 9s. out of the Wiltshire deanery of Marlborough.

A forty days' indulgence was granted by the bishop on 12 April 1313, to all who gave assistance to the convent of Poughley, for a grievous fire had destroyed their granaries and mills, and other buildings in which their goods were stored.

A commission was issued in February 1428, to inquire into the complaint made by John Dyke, who stated that he had a crown grant, under a yearly rent, of a messuage, lands, meadows and a moiety of the water of Lambourn in the lordship of Speen, and that the prior of Poughley had recently built a mill across the water, through which the water could not keep its right course, but had flooded its banks and the king's lands and meadows.

In January 1469, Pope Paul II granted to Prior Thomas Sutton of Poughley, the annual income of whose priory was stated not to exceed £50, dispensation to hold with the priory, for the term of his natural life, some other ecclesiastical benefice, usually held by a secular priest, whether it should be a rectory or vicarage, provided he was duly presented and instituted.

This small priory was amongst the first group of religious houses for the incorporation of which Cardinal Wolsey obtained the pope's bull and the king's licence, in 1524, for the use of his college in Oxford. The dissolution of the monastery was formally accomplished on 14 February in that year, John Somers being prior, the spiritualities being declared of the annual value of £10 and the temporalities £61 11s. 7d.

The inquisitions taken at the time of its suppression showed that the priory then held the churches of Chaddleworth and Kingston, the manors of West Batterton, Peasemore, Curridge and Bagnor, and messuages, lands and tenements in 32 Berkshire parishes.

In January 1527, Edward Fetyplace, treasurer to Charles Brandon, 1st Duke of Suffolk, wrote to Thomas Cromwell, upbraiding him with breaking his word as to granting him the site of Poughley, on the faith of which he had given Cromwell 40s. at the time of its dissolution, and yet the lease had been granted to another man. This letter is of particular interest, as showing that the house of the dissolved priory was for a time occupied by scholars of Wolsey's great college then in course of erection.

In February 1529, Fetyplace wrote again to Cromwell, requesting his support to secure a longer term for the lease of the farm at Poughley. From this letter, it is evident that Cromwell had recently visited the dismantled priory, as Fetyplace mentions a visit to Poughley on "the Thursday after our departing" by one John Edden, who arrived with a cart to collect items designated for Wolsey’s College at Oxford.

Certain "wages" or pensions were being paid in 1530 by Wolsey to the dispossessed canons and monks of the dissolved houses. An entry was made that year of "wages of 3 canons at Poughley, 40s.". The same year goods were sold at Poughley that realised £29, and the bells were valued at £33 6s. 8d.

== Priors of Poughley ==
- Jerome, occurs 1182
- William, occurs 1236
- Robert, 13th century
- Yvo, resigned 1313
- John de Lamborne, elected 1313
- Ralph de Pesmere, 1348
- Geoffrey, occurs 1350
- William Marlborough, resigned 1442
- John Helme, alias Hungerford, elected 1442
- Thomas Sutton, occurs 1469–1474
- Thomas Ware, resigned 1497
- William Nordon, elected 1497, died 1521
- John Devynyshe, appointed 1521
- Somers, surrendered 1524

== Common seal ==
The common seal of this priory (1244) bears St. Margaret trampling on a dragon, with a triplethonged scourge in the right hand, and a book in the left. Legend: SIGILL': SBE MARGAR . . . : CLENFORDE . . .

The reverse has the small counterseal of Prior William, representing the prior in his habit holding a book. Legend: SIGILL': WILL'MI: PRIORIS: DE: POCCHELEG
