= Jacko Page =

Retired British Army officer

Lieutenant General Jacko Page CB OBE
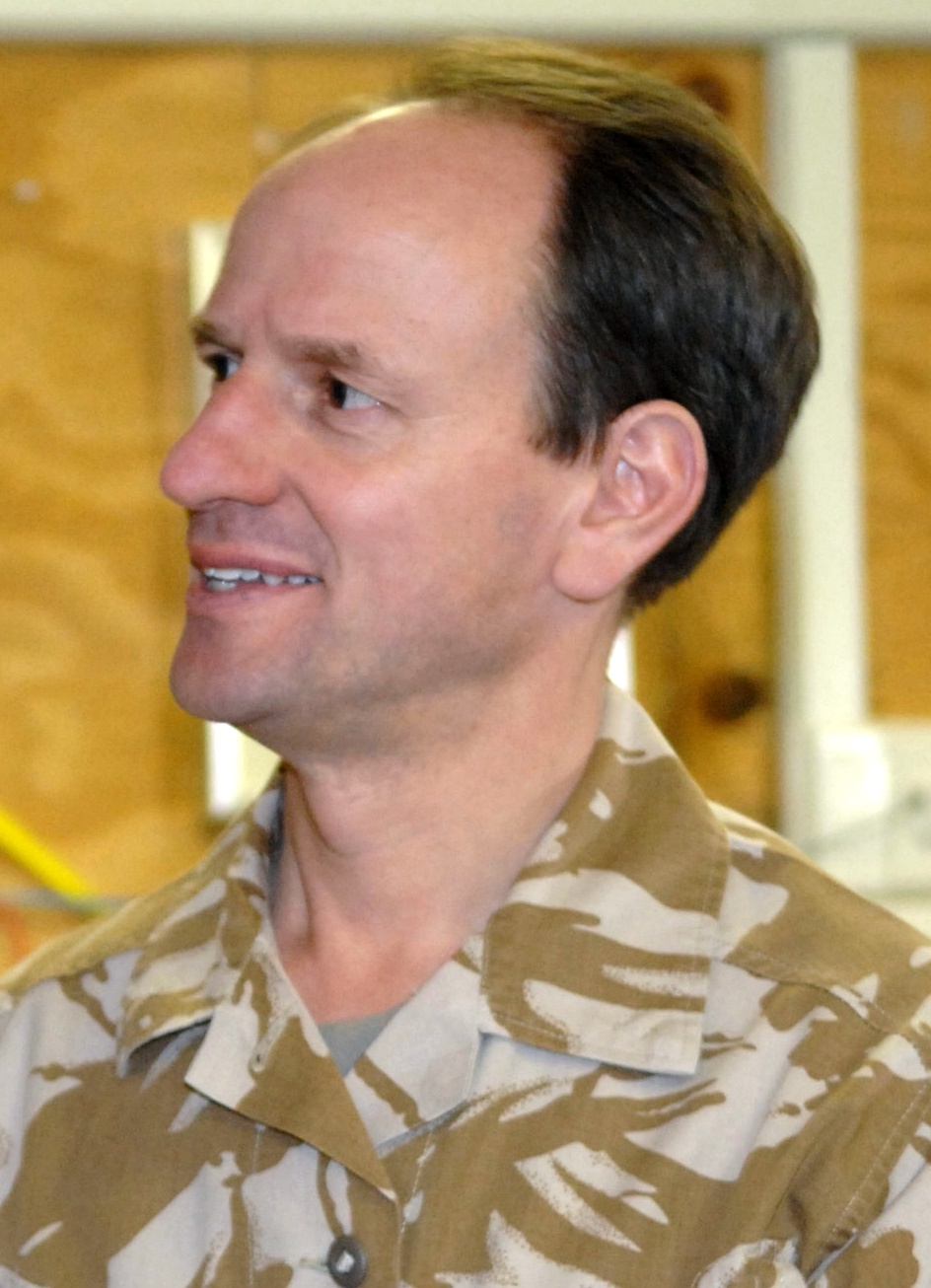
- Page in 2007
- Born: 25 February 1959 (age 67); Norwich, Norfolk, England
- Military career
- Allegiance: United Kingdom
- Branch: British Army
- Service years: 1981–2014
- Rank: Lieutenant General
- Nickname: Jacko
- Service number: 512953
- Commands: Director Special Forces (2009–2012); 6th Division (2008–2009)
- Conflicts: Falklands War; Gulf War; Bosnian War; Iraq War; War in Afghanistan
- Awards: Companion of the Order of the Bath; Officer of the Order of the British Empire; Mentioned in Despatches; Queen's Commendation for Valuable Service

Lieutenant General Jonathan David "Jacko" Page, CB, OBE (born 25 February 1959) is a retired senior British Army officer.

== Early life ==
Page was born in Norwich, Norfolk, on 25 February 1959.

== Military career ==
Page commissioned into the Parachute Regiment in 1981. In 1989, he commanded an armoured squadron of the Royal Scots Dragoon Guards and deployed to the Middle East for Operation Granby, the British military contribution to the Gulf War.

As well as staff posts in the Ministry of Defence, Page has served as chief of staff of 24 Airmobile Brigade and with United Nations Protection Force in Sarajevo, Bosnia and Herzegovina. He assumed command of 16 Air Assault Brigade in December 2002, which deployed as part of Operation Telic, the British contribution to the 2003 invasion of Iraq.

On 1 May 2007, Page replaced Dutch Major General Ton van Loon as Regional Command South in Afghanistan for a six-month period. This NATO ISAF command was responsible for southern Afghanistan, where some of the most intensive combat operations against the Taliban took place. Then in 2008 he was appointed General Officer Commanding 6th Division (a new divisional headquarters in York), and in 2009 he was appointed Director Special Forces. Page was appointed a Companion of the Order of the Bath in the 2009 New Year Honours, and went on to be Commander Force Development and Training in February 2012 with the rank of lieutenant general.

Military offices
New command	General Officer Commanding 6th Division; 2008–2009	Succeeded by Nick Carter
Preceded by Adrian Bradshaw	Director Special Forces; 2009–2012	Succeeded by Mark Carleton-Smith
Preceded by Paul Newton	Commander Force Development and Training; 2012–2014	Succeeded by Mark Poffley
