= Ralph Chubb =

English poet, printer and artist

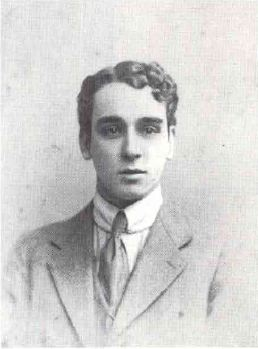
- Ralph Chubb in 1912
- Born: Ralph Nicholas Chubb; 8 February 1892; Harpenden, Hertfordshire, England
- Died: 14 January 1960 (aged 67); Stratfield Saye, Hampshire, England
- Resting place: Kingsclere Woodland Church
- Occupations: Poet, printer, and artist

Ralph Nicholas Chubb (8 February 1892 – 14 January 1960) was an English poet, printer and artist. Heavily influenced by Whitman, Blake, and the Romantics, his work was the creation of a highly intricate personal mythology, one that was anti-materialist and sexually revolutionary.

== Life ==
Ralph Chubb was born in Harpenden, Hertfordshire. His family moved to the historic town of St Albans before his first birthday. Chubb attended St Albans School and Selwyn College, Cambridge, before becoming an officer in the First World War. He served with distinction but developed neurasthenia, and he was invalided out in 1918.

From 1919 to 1922 Chubb studied at the Slade School of Art in London. It was there that he met Leon Underwood and other influential artists. He went on to contribute several articles and poems for Underwood's magazine, The Island. Although his work was displayed at such venues as the Goupil Gallery and the Royal Academy of Art, his paintings did not sell. There are several in public collections in Britain. His major painting The Well (1920) is in Wakefield; Southampton has bathers with boys wrestling, and there are nudes at Leamington, all illustrated in the Public Art Foundation catalogues. He moved with his family to the village of Curridge, near Newbury in Berkshire. He began to devote his artistic talents to the printed works which would remain his chief labour in life.

His books were created in several chief phases. His typeset books of the twenties were a humble offering, exhibiting Chubb's talent for woodcutting and his quaint, visually inspired poetry. Even at this early stage, Chubb's lifelong obsession with adolescent males was beginning to become apparent. He expands upon this theme more explicitly in An Appendix, a pederastic and spiritualist manifesto duplicated from a cursive manuscript. An Appendix was the first of his printed works to be printed in his own hand; he soon followed this with the first of his opulent lithographic books, The Sun Spirit. Throughout the nineteen-thirties, Chubb's books became more elaborate and appealing. Water Cherubs crystallises Chubb's aesthetic of the youthful male form, and The Secret Country unfolds like an illuminated manuscript, recounting stories of Chubb's family and his journeys among the Romani of the New Forest in Hampshire. Chubb's printing press was interrupted by the war, but in 1948 he entered into the third period of career with two massive volumes: The Child Of Dawn and Flames of Sunrise. Each page of these two volumes is crowded with obscure digressions on Chubb's mythology and drawings of symbolic significance. Briefly summarised, Chubb's vision was a prophecy of the redemption of 'Albion', or England, by the boy-god Ra-el-phaos, of whom Ralph claimed himself to be the prophet and herald. This echoes an earlier announcement to be found in The Heavenly Cupid:

I announce a secret event as tremendous and mysterious as any that has occurred in the spiritual history of the world. I announce the inauguration of a Third Dispensation, the dispensation of the Holy Ghost on earth, and the visible advent thereof on earth in the form of a Young Boy of thirteen years old, naked perfect and unblemished.

Other themes run through all of Chubb's work. He was forever haunted by the memory of a young chorister at St Albans who disappeared from Chubb's life just as he had summoned up the courage to speak to him. Similarly, a brief sexual relationship with another boy when Ralph was 19 seemed to serve as a template for future visions of paradise. Chubb's books become progressively more self-involved and paranoid. Seeking to articulate his pederastic desires, he created a personal mythology which explained everything in terms only he could understand. Nonetheless, Chubb's work is of fascinating psychological significance; each of the various angels, knights, seers, and boy-gods in his dream world represents an aspect of his introspective and persecuted self.

Chubb, like many other artists of his generation, resented science for its intrusion into his imagination. He disparaged the scientists, orthodox theologians, and politicians of world, accusing them of squelching his personal thirst for liberty. In 1927 he wrote:

Existence, besides being a miracle, is a symbol. Albeit here for inscrutable purposes the spirit is only to be discerned as it were in a distorting-glass. (The Book of God's Madness)

Chubb sought to persuade his readers in An Appendix of the verity of his solipsism by illustrating some examples of serendipitous events from his life. His aim is more on the mark when he excoriates the taboos and frustrations of modern life.

The green green hills, the blue blue sky, blue sea, great golden SUN, yellow dandelions, the pink naked beauty of ripe boyhood, deathless free and happy, brimming with health. This I must have. Nothing less than this can ever satisfy me! GIVE ME MY HEAVEN! GIVE ME MY HEAVEN! (Water-Cherubs)

Failing in health and facing continuing legal and financial difficulties, Chubb abandoned his controversial works in the mid-fifties, and began to collect and reprint his early poems and childhood memories. Treasure Trove and The Golden City (published posthumously) are devoid of the usual profusion of naked, lissome youths, but instead offer a glimpse into his youthful imagination, and some of his most charming poetry. In the final years of his life he donated his remaining volumes to the national libraries of Britain. He died peacefully at Fair Oak Cottage in Hampshire and was buried next to his parents at the Kingsclere Woodland Cemetery in Hampshire.

Chubb's own assessment of his work conforms to the general critical reaction:

I do not necessarily claim to be a great artist or writer; but I claim to be a true spirit – this is a subtler test. Seek me out; but you may not find me. (An Appendix)

== Works ==
None of the editions of Chubb's books exceed more than 200 copies, and some of his lithographed masterworks exist in only 30 or 40 copies, of which a mere six or seven are meticulously hand-coloured by Chubb.

The dates and titles of Chubb's printed works are given below.

=== Early typeset works ===
- 1924 Manhood
- 1924 The Sacrifice of Youth
- 1925 A Fable of Love & War
- 1927 The Cloud & the Voice
- 1928 Woodcuts
- 1928 The Book of God's Madness
- 1929 An Appendix (duplicated hand-written text)
- 1930 Songs of Mankind

=== Lithographed texts ===
- 1931 The Sun Spirit
- 1934 The Heavenly Cupid
- 1935 Songs Pastoral and Paradisal (illustrated by Vincent Stuart; script by Helen Hinkley)
- 1936 Water Cherubs
- 1939 The Secret Country

=== Post-war prophetic texts ===
- 1948 The Child of Dawn
- 1953 Flames of Sunrise

=== Juvenilia and early romances ===
- 1957 Treasure Trove
- 1960 The Golden City

=== Posthumous works ===
- 1965 The Day of St Alban
- 1970 Autumn Leaves

== References and further reading ==
- Cave, Roderick (1960), 'In Blake's Tradition: the Press of Ralph Chubb', The American Book Collector, 11 (2), pp. 8–17
- Cave, Roderick (1960). 'Blake's Mantle', a Memoir of Ralph Chubb', Book Design and Production. 3 (2), pp. 24–28
- D'Arch Smith, Timothy (1970). Love in Earnest. London: Routledge & Kegan Paul.
- Rahman, Tariq (1991), 'Ephebophilia and the Creation of a Spiritual Myth in the Works of Ralph Nicholas Chubb', Journal of Homosexuality, 20 (1–2), pp. 103–27
- Reid, Anthony (1970). Ralph Chubb: The Unknown. Reprinted from The Private Library. 3 (3–4).

== See also ==
- Uranians
- Private press
- LGBT literature
