= Steve Tatham =

American creative director, designer, and academic

- Professor Tatham hosting a panel at the University of Southern California
- Born: San Diego, California, U.S.
- Education: Reed College (attended); University of California, Berkeley (BA); University of California, Los Angeles (MArch); Harvard Graduate School of Design
- Occupations: Creative director, designer
- Employer(s): MDSX (Chief Creative Officer); USC School of Cinematic Arts
- Known for: Universal Epic Universe
- Website: www.stevetatham.com

Steve Tatham is an American creative director, designer, and academic. Tatham is perhaps best known for his contributions to amusement park design at Walt Disney Imagineering and Universal Creative, including serving as Executive Creative Director for Universal Epic Universe.

Tatham is the Chief Creative Officer at MDSX and a professor of Experience Design at the University of Southern California School of the Cinematic Arts. In 2026, he became the director of the university's new themed entertainment program.

== Education ==
Tatham attended Reed College in Oregon for a year as a freshmen majoring in political science. He dropped out of Reed and moved to the Bay area, and enrolled in University of California, Berkeley, where he earned a B.A. in Film Design in 1983, followed by a Master of Architecture from University of California, Los Angeles (UCLA) in 1987. He also completed the AMDP executive-education program at Harvard Graduate School of Design in 2023.

== Career ==
Tatham began his career at Walt Disney Imagineering, holding roles including show-set designer, show writer, designer, and R&D Imagineer. He contributed to every Disney theme park prior to the opening of Shanghai Disneyland.

In 2014, Tatham joined Universal Studios Japan as Vice President of Creative, leading design efforts in Osaka for four years. He later relocated to Orlando, Florida, where he served as Vice President and subsequently Executive Creative Director for Universal Creative, overseeing the creative development of Epic Universe. He is featured in the 2025 Peacock documentary Epic Ride, discussing the creation of the park.

As a comic writer, Tatham is the author of 1001: A Video Odyssey. He also authored Repuglicans, which was named one of The Village Voice’s top graphic novels and comics of 2010.

In 2025, Tatham was appointed Chief Creative Officer at MDSX, a creative studio specializing in immersive design.

== Awards and honors ==
- 2008 - LA Weekly People of LA
- 2010 - Webby Award Honoree
- 2024 - Blooloop Innovation Awards

== Bibliography ==
- 1001: A Video Odyssey (2000)
- Repuglicans (2010)
