= Media Operations Group =

Specialist army reserve unit

The Media Operations Group was a nationally recruited, specialist Army Reserve unit and was part of the British Army.

The Media Operations Group engaged in enabling media reporting of operations involving the British Army both nationally and internationally, as well as in training and exercises. It was set up to run press centres, as well as organise press conferences and interviews with the media. Personnel underwent specialist training operate alongside regular units.

Under Army 2020, the Media Operations Group moved into the Army's newly-formed Security Assistance Group (SAG), ultimately becoming subsumed within the SAG's successor, 77th Brigade (United Kingdom), and ceasing to operate as a formed unit.
