= Denison Barracks =

British Army installation at Hermitage in Berkshire, England

- Hermitage
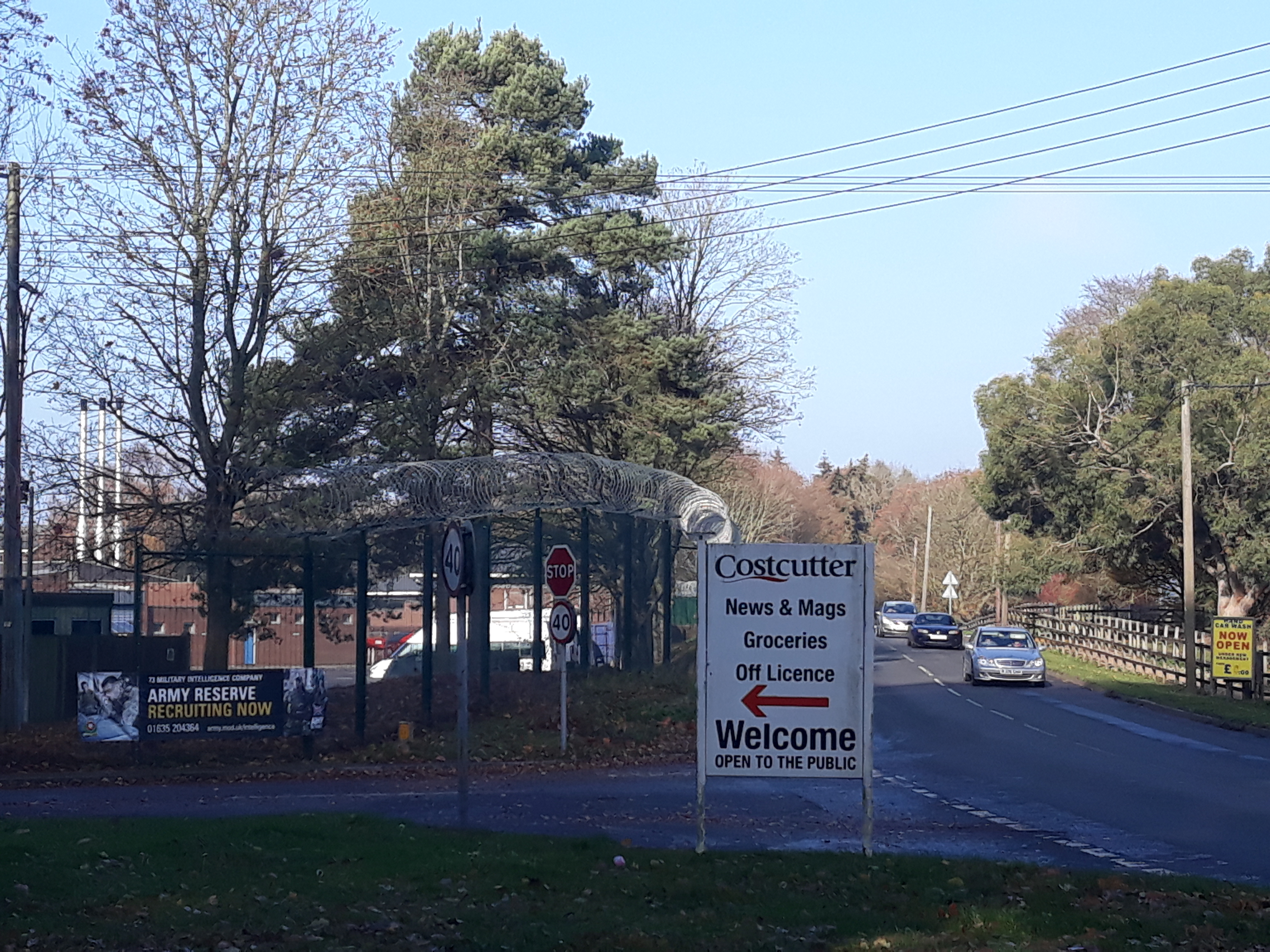
- Entrance to Denison Barracks

Site information
- Type: Barracks
- Owner: Ministry of Defence
- Operator: British Army

Location
- Location within Berkshire
- Coordinates: 51.45381°N 1.28271°W

Site history
- Built: 1949
- Built for: War Office
- In use: 1949-Present

Garrison information
- Occupants: 77th Brigade; Royal School of Military Survey

Denison Barracks is a British Army installation at Hermitage in Berkshire, England.

== History ==
The site was used as an American military hospital during the Second World War before becoming the home of Royal School of Military Survey in 1949. The barracks were named after General Sir William Denison, a prominent Royal Engineer. In order to consolidate all survey activities in one location, the rest of the Military Survey organisation moved to the site in the 1960s. 42 Engineer Regiment (Geographic) was formed at the barracks in 1987.

In March 2013, the Ministry of Defence announced a £10 million investment to allow the Military Stabilisation Support Unit, the Defence Cultural Specialist Unit, Land Intelligence Fusion Centre and 15 Psychological Operations Group to move onto the site. In July 2014, 42 Engineer Regiment (Geographic) left the barracks and moved to RAF Wyton.

77th Brigade moved to the site and became fully operational in April 2015. The brigade consists of "Tactical PsyOps teams" as well as experts in photography, journalism, marketing, social media, AI, academia & research (mis-information), graphic design and more.

== Units ==
The units currently located at this barracks are:

- Headquarters, 77th Brigade
- Royal School of Military Survey
- Specialist Group Military Intelligence (Reserve)
- 73 Military Intelligence Company (Reserve)
