= 77th Brigade (United Kingdom) =

British Army information warfare unit

- Brigade emblem, the Chinthe
- Active: 13 September 1914–10 May 1919; 1 September 2014– 14 April 2026
- Country: United Kingdom
- Branch: British Army
- Size: 5 Groups
- Part of: 26th Division (1914–1919); Force Troops Command (2014–2019); 6th Division (2019–2024); Field Army Troops (2024–2025); Land Special Operations Force (2025–present)
- Garrison/HQ: Denison Barracks
- Engagements: Second Battle of Doiran; Third Battle of Doiran

The 77th Brigade is a British Army information operations and psychological warfare formation, created in January 2015. It was a retitling of the Security Assistance Group, created as part of the Army 2020 reorganisation after the Strategic Defence and Security Review 2010.

A previous 77th Brigade served in both world wars. The brigade initially brought together a psychological warfare unit; a media operations unit; and the Military Stabilisation and Support Group (MSSG). It is based at Denison Barracks in Hermitage, Berkshire and became operational in April 2015.

The original 77th Brigade was formed in 1914 as part of 'Kitchener's Army'. Consisting of Scottish infantry battalions it served with 26th Division on the Salonika Front during World War I. It took part in the disastrous Second Battle of Doiran in 1917, and the equally costly Third Battle of Doiran near the end of the war. It took part in the postwar occupation of Bulgaria before it was disbanded in 1919.

The present-day brigade was named the 77th in tribute to the 77th Indian Infantry Brigade, which was part of the Chindits, an Indian Army guerilla warfare force led by Orde Wingate who used unorthodox tactics against the Japanese in Burma in World War II. The formation badge of the revived 77th shows a stylized lion known as a Chinthe in reference to the Chindits.

== World War I ==
=== Recruitment and training ===
On 6 August 1914, less than 48 hours after Britain's declaration of war, Parliament sanctioned an increase of 500,000 men for the Regular British Army. The newly-appointed Secretary of State for War, Earl Kitchener of Khartoum, issued his famous call to arms: 'Your King and Country Need You', urging the first 100,000 volunteers to come forward. This group of six divisions with supporting arms became known as Kitchener's First New Army, or 'K1'. The K2 and K3 battalions, brigades and divisions quickly followed: 26th Division, containing 77th, 78th and 79th Brigades, was authorised on 13 September as part of K3. The K1 and K2 divisions had regional affiliations, but this had been abandoned by the time the K3 formations were organised; nevertheless, 77th Bde was composed entirely of Scottish battalions. Colonel H.P. Shekleton, who had been Assistant Adjutant and Quartermaster General (AA&QMG) in the Malta Garrison on the outbreak of war, was appointed Temporary Brigadier-General to command 77th Bde on 25 September 1914. However, he was transferred to the General Staff in France as an AA&QMG on 5 October and was succeeded in command of 77th Bde on 25 October by Brig-Gen Sir Hugh Houghton Stewart, 4th Baronet of Athenree, a retired Militia colonel. (Note: 3rd (Fermanagh Militia) Battalion, Royal Inniskilling Fusiliers; also commanded 22nd (Rough Riders) Battalion, Imperial Yeomanry, during the Second Boer War.) Brigade headquarters (HQ) formed at Codford St Mary on the edge of Salisbury Plain, where the battalions arrived from their regimental depots in September and October.

As the junior division of K3, there were no khaki uniforms available for the men, who were clothed in any makeshift uniforms the clothing contractors could find. Later it became possible to issue a form of blue uniform. It took longer to obtain drill-pattern rifles and accoutrements, but barrack-square training continued until the weather worsened at the end of October, turning the drill ground and tent floors into a sea of mud. In November the division was dispersed into billets, with 77th Bde in Bristol. The men now had drill rifles for training, and khaki uniforms and equipment arrived between February and April 1915. Between 26 April and 8 May the units returned to Salisbury Plain and were concentrated in huts between Sutton Veny and Longbridge Deverill near Warminster. Brigade training could now begin, and the drill rifles were slowly replaced by Short Magazine Lee–Enfield Mk III service rifles. Divisional training started in July, followed by final battle training. The division completed its mobilisation on 10 September and was ordered to France to join the British Expeditionary Force on the Western Front. The first advanced parties left on 12 September and by 23 September the division had completed its concentration around Guignemicourt, west of Amiens. However the division did not remain in France for long, and at the beginning of November 1915 it began moving to Marseilles for embarkation to the Salonika front, where it fought for the duration of the war.

=== Order of Battle ===
The composition of 77th Brigade was as follows:

- 8th (Service) Battalion, Royal Scots Fusiliers (RSF)
- 11th (Service) Battalion, Cameronians (Scottish Rifles)
- 10th (Service) Battalion, Black Watch – to Western Front 30 June 1918
- 12th (Service) Battalion, Argyll and Sutherland Highlanders (A&SH)
- 77th Machine Gun (MG) Company, Machine Gun Corps – formed at Grantham, embarked at Devonport 5 July 1916; disembarked at Salonika 14 July and joined brigade 24 July
- 77th Trench Mortar Battery (TMB) – manned by detachments from the infantry; joined 3 November 1916
- 77th Small Arms Ammunition (SAA) Section – manned by the Royal Field Artillery; numbered 23 March 1916; detached from Divisional Ammunition Column (DAC) and joined brigade 27 July 1916

=== Service ===
From 28 September 1915 the brigades and battalions of 26th Division were attached to units already in the line for their introduction to Trench warfare. Then on 31 October the division was ordered to Marseille to embark for another theatre. Entrainment began at Flesselles on 9 November and embarkation two days later, with the division expecting to be sent to Egypt. However, the destination was changed to the Macedonian front, and ships carrying elements of the division. began to arrive at Salonika on 23 November. On 26 December the first units moved out of the Salonika base area to Happy Valley Camp, where the division completed its concentration on 8 February 1916.

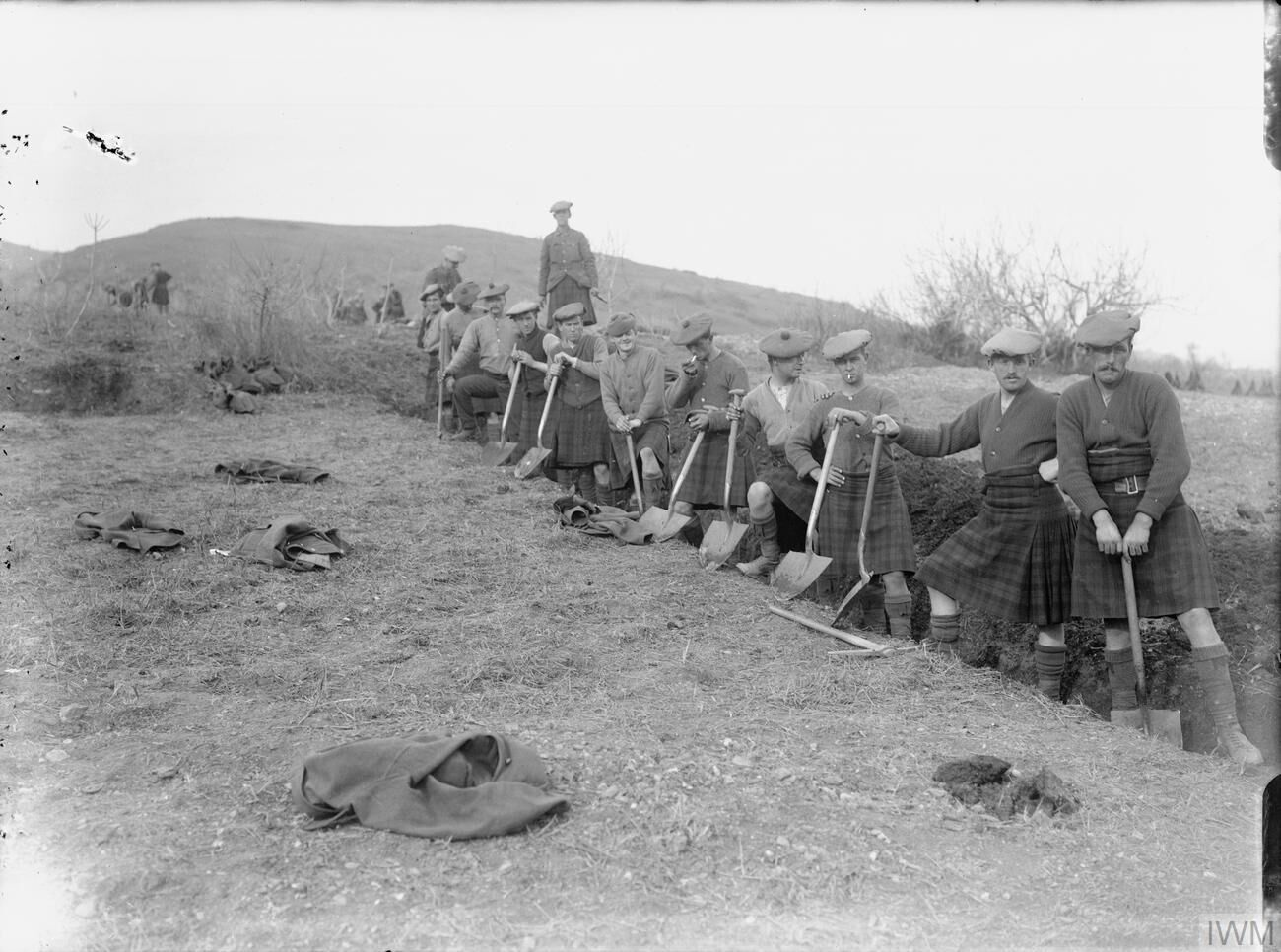
Men of 10th (Service) Battalion, Black Watch, take a break from digging trenches, December 1915.

When the Allies moved out of their entrenched camp in April 26th Division. remained behind as Army Reserve and for road construction. Because of the movement difficulties in the mountainous terrain, the British Salonika Army (BSA) reorganised its transport to rely on pack mules. One result of this was that by July the reorganised brigade SAA sections were detached from the DAC and attached to the brigades they served. In August 26th Division moved up to the Lake Doiran sector of the front. 77th Brigade was in divisional reserve and did not take part in the Battle of Horseshoe Hill on 17 August. Afterwards they conducted a holding operation for the rest of the year, with numerous raids to pin down the Bulgarians; the other brigades of 26th Division carried out raids on 23 December and against the Petit Couronné on 10 February 1917.

==== Second Battle of Doiran ====
In March and April 1917 the BSA was repositioned in preparation for an offensive in the Doiran sector. 26th Division was now one of the more experienced in the theatre, and was given a wide front of about 8,000 yards (7,300 m) (although part of it was covered by the lake). It advanced without opposition on the night of 9/10 March to take over the mounds known as the Whale Back and Bowls Barrow. The main attack (the Second Battle of Doiran) was carried out at dusk on 24 April after three days of artillery fire to cut the Bulgarian barbed wire. 26th Division attacked with 78th and 79th Bdes in line. The attack by 79th Bde on the Jumeaux Ravine was a disaster, and at midnight 77th Bde in reserve was ordered to send up a battalion in support. 12th Argyll & Sutherland Highlanders set off from its camp by the railway at 01.30 on 25 April and marched about 2 miles (3.2 km) to enter the Jumeaux Ravine, where it found the trenches blocked with wounded and stretcher-parties. It was not ready to join 79th Bde's renewed attack until 04.10, but before it could be launched 78th Bde had fallen back from the Petit Couronné. The attack was called off at the last minute: one company of 12th A&SH did start out, but was called back in time.

When the attack was renewed on the night of 8 May, the attacking brigades had practised the assault over taped-out representations of the enemy line. 77th Brigade led the assault, avoiding the Jumeaux Ravine and concentrating on the ridge to the right of Petit Couronné, with objectives labelled O1, O2 and O3. The brigade had attached to it the 9th Gloucestershire Regiment from 78th Bde and the divisional pioneer battalion, 8th Oxfordshire and Buckinghamshire Light Infantry. On the right, the two attacking companies of 11th Scottish Rifles reached their objectives with heavy casualties, but were bombed out again and the supporting company got lost. On the left one of the two attacking companies of 10th Black Watch was held up by uncut wire, the other was late and lost the creeping barrage, and although it got into the Bulgarian trenches it was bombed out again; the support company was stooped by the same uncut wire. In the centre 12th A&SH had started from 200 yards (180 m) in front of the British wire and had avoided the worst of the Bulgarian defensive barrage. The companies entered the enemy front line, bombing the dugouts and then moving onto the final objective. Here they began to consolidate the position, but finding that they were isolated by the failures on either flank and that all their officers were casualties, the men withdrew after about half an hour without any warning having reached Brigade HQ. 8th Royal Scots Fusiliers had placed one company at the disposal of each of the attacking battalions to help hold the objectives: they slowly made their way up shelled and congested communication trenches. They found that the attacking companies of 11th Scottish Rifles had simply disappeared; 12th A&SH was being reorganised by its commanding officer, Lieutenant-Colonel Ronald Falconar Stewart; Lt-Col J. Harvey of 10th Black Watch was trying to organise a fresh attack with his reserve company and the company from 8th RSF. 9th Gloucesters was also moving up to attack from the objectives of 12th A&SH and 10th Black Watch, and the divisional reserve, 11th Worcestershire Regiment had also been sent up. All six battalions were then ordered to attack at 04.30, then delayed until 05.50, but the second order did not reach 10th Black Watch which attacked with its company of 8th RSF and was repulsed again. At the revised zero hour, 11th Worcesters reported that the shelling was so heavy that they could not form up, and (incorrectly) that the other troops had withdrawn: the Worcesters were ordered to fall back to cover. Yet 9th Gloucesters had advanced on time, finding the enemy trenches at O2 empty apart from the dead, but was under fire from O1 where 11th Scottish Rifles had not advanced. The attack was called off, and all the troops withdrawn; the last to go back was the company of 8th RSF that had attacked with 10th Black Watch and was close to the enemy's trench and engaging them with Lewis gun fire.

The BSA settled down once more to trench warfare and raids. On 4 November 12th A&SH raided Boyau Hill after three days of preliminary bombardment. Because the enemy were still holding the trenches in strength, the raiders went in behind a barrage and there was a fierce battle in the dark with bomb and bayonet. Bulgarian losses were very heavy, but the British also lost 54 men including casualties to parties making demonstrations on other parts of the line.

The crisis on the Western Front after the German spring offensive in early 1918 led to urgent calls for reinforcements to be sent from other theatres. In June the BSA was required to send 12 infantry battalions, one from each of its brigades: 10th Black Watch was sent from 77th Bde. As well as this loss of manpower, the BSA was crippled by malaria, which left many of the troops in hospital during the summer months.

==== Third Battle of Doiran ====
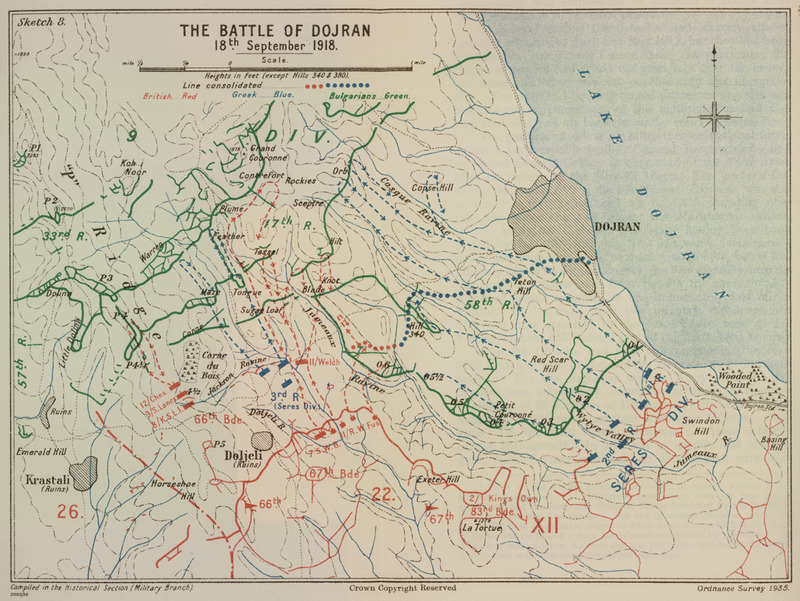
The Third Battle of Doiran, 18 September 1918: 77th Brigade fought over the same ground on 19 September.

Preparations began in August 1918 for a new offensive in the autumn. 22nd Division was taken out of the line for three weeks' special training, and 77th Bde took over the left half of its front on 15–17 August. However, there was an outbreak of Spanish flu in 65th Bde of 22nd Division at the beginning of September, rendering it unfit for the planned attack, 77th Brigade was therefore assigned to replace it in 22nd Division. Luckily, there was time to withdraw the brigade for a few days' training before the attack. The battle Third Battle of Doiran began on 18 September with attacks by British and Greek troops on either side of Lake Doiran. 22nd Division and the Serres Division failed in their assault on 'Pip Ridge' and the Grand Couronné, suffering heavy casualties. The only British troops fit to renew the attack next day were 77th Bde and the weak 65th Bde. 77th Brigade was ordered to capture and consolidate the sequence of points known as the 'Sugar Loaf', the 'Knot', the 'Tassel', the 'Rockies' and the 'Plume', before attempting to take the Grand Couronné. On their right a Greek battalion would tackle the Hilt and the Orb, while on the left a battalion of 65th Bde and a French regiment would attack Pip Ridge. However, moving up to its jumping-off point 12th A&SH came across the French regiment sheltering in a ravine under harassing fire and unwilling to move to its assembly position. The attack began at 05.23 after a short preliminary bombardment. 12th A&SH and 8th RSF quickly took the Sugar Loaf and moved on to the 'Tongue' beyond, while 11th Scottish Rifles captured the 'Fang' and advanced towards the Knot. So far only 8th RSF had taken significant casualties, from artillery fire as they crossed the Sugar Loaf. As the battalions climbed higher towards the Tongue, the Knot and the Tassel, they ran into heavier fire, some of it from machine guns in a concealed concrete emplacement. Reinforced by their support and reserve companies the A&SH and RSF broke into the Tongue, but the absence of the French regiment left them open to heavy enfilade fire from Pip Ridge on the left. Three attempts to push onto the final objective were thwarted, and Lt-Col Falconar Stewart withdrew his men to reorganise at the Tongue. Similarly, the Scottish Rifles company sent to take the Knot was turned back by fire from the right, where the Greeks had been forced back from the Hilt to their start line. The company rejoined the rest of Scottish Rifles in clearing enemy trenches between the Tassel and the Tongue, but an attempt to reach the Tassel failed, and the battalion pulled back to the Tongue. With both flanks 'in the air', under fire from the Plume and Rockies in front and with ammunition running low, 77th Bde was in a dangerous position on the Tongue. The captured positions were defended against three counter-attacks, the third being beaten off with captured stick grenades, rocks and bayonets. By the time ammunition arrived the Bulgarian bombardment had intensified and parties were working their way round the brigade's flanks and rear: Falconar Stewart had made the decision to withdraw by battalions, evacuating the wounded and equipment. 11th Scottish Rifles led off, followed by 8th RSF, but when it was 12th A&SH's turn to retire, enemy parties got among the battalion in the smoke and confusion, and succeeded in capturing a number of them; Falconar Stewart was killed in the melée. 77th Brigade's losses on 19 September had been very heavy:

- 8th RSF: 358
- 11th Scottish Rifles: 228
- 12th A&SH: 299 (out of 517 in action)

Afterwards, the 12th A&SH was honoured with the award of the French Croix de Guerre to the battalion.

=== Armistices ===
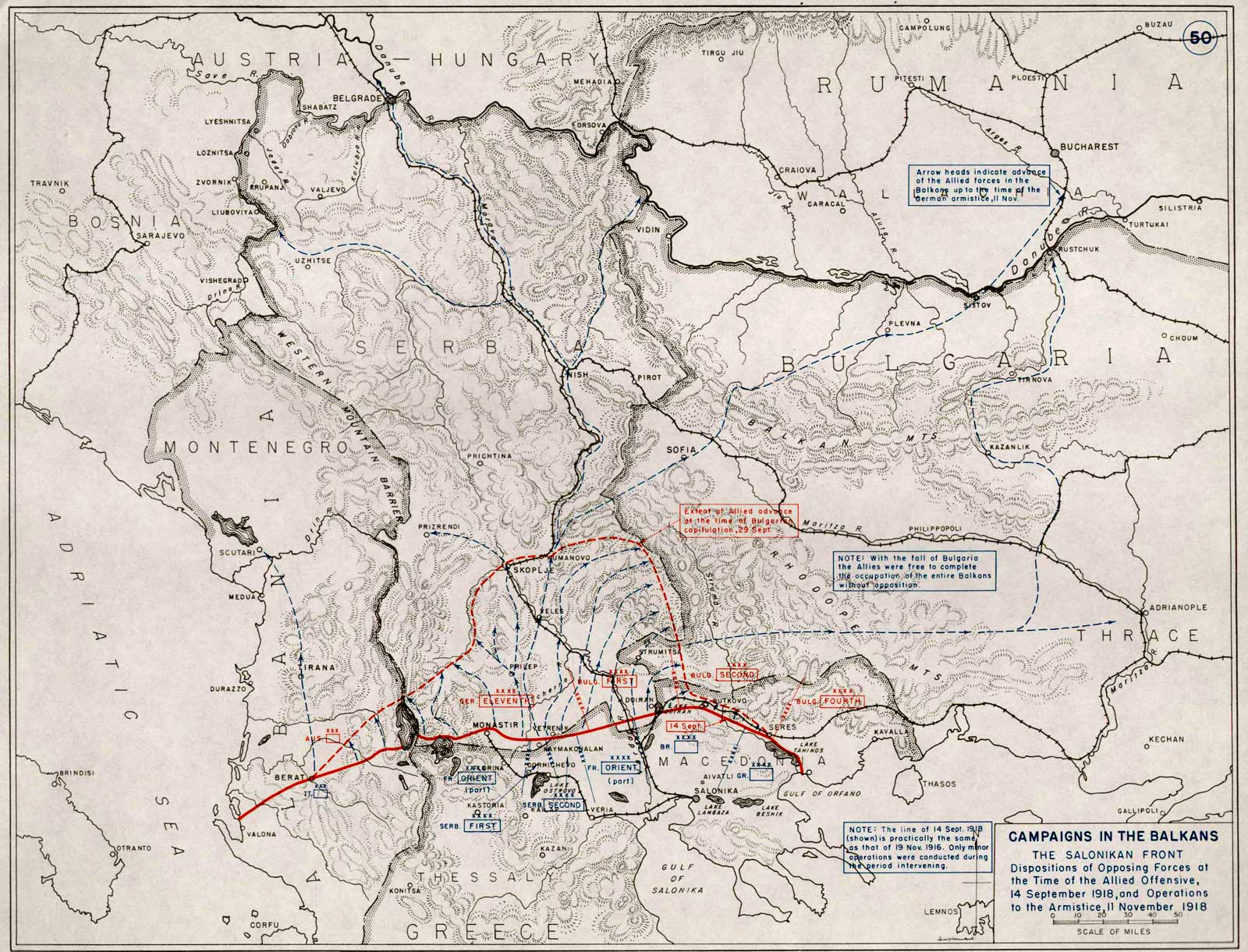
The final weeks on the Macedonian Front, including the advance to Adrianople.

In spite of the disaster at Doiran, the Allies were making good progress elsewhere along the Macedonian Front, and enemy forces were crumbling. The Bulgarians began to retreat on 21 September, but 22nd Division and 77th Bde were too exhausted to take part in the pursuit, which was led in the British sector by the rest of 26th Division. On 24 September the Bulgarians requested a ceasefire, and the Armistice of Salonica was signed on 29 September. On 6 October 26th Division began a march across Bulgaria towards the River Danube to continue operations against Austria–Hungary. It reached Kocherinovo on 18 October, but was then redirected towards the Turkish frontier. 77th Brigade entrained at Radomir on 20 October and reached Mustafa Pasha (west of Adrianople) next day, accompanied by Lieutenant-General Sir Charles Briggs. Briggs reconnoitred the frontier on 22 October, finding few Turkish troops, and planned to rush 77th Bde by rail to Adrianople Station after dusk on 24 October to cross the River Marita by ferries and seize the bridges and city by Coup de main. However, the Turks were also seeking peace and Briggs' bold plan was rejected. The Ottoman Empire signed the Armistice of Mudros on 30 October. On 2 November 26th Division was ordered to resume its advance to the Danube, but next day the Austrians signed the Armistice of Villa Giusti.

With hostilities over, 26th Division remained in Bulgaria as part of the Allied occupation force. At the end of the year 77th Bde was operating as a semi-independent brigade group stationed at Ruscuk. Demobilization began in February 1919 and proceeded rapidly. Italian troops began taking over 26th Division's responsibilities from April and on 19–22 April a composite brigade from the division under Brig-Gen W.A. Blake of 77th Bde left for service in Egypt. 26th Division and its formations ceased to exist on 10 May 1919.

77th Brigade was not reactivated in the British Army during World War II, but 77th Indian Infantry Brigade was formed by the British Indian Army.

=== Insignia ===
26th Division's formation sign.

All units of 26th Division wore a simple blue tape across the base of the shoulder straps, introduced as the divisional sign in July 1916. No brigade or battalion distinctions were worn. However, when the division was first formed and no uniforms or regimental badges were available, the battalions in each brigade were temporarily distinguished by a coloured cloth patch in buff, blue, white or green.

=== Commanders ===
The following officers commanded 77th Brigade during World War I:

- Brigadier-General H.P. Shekleton, from 25 September to 5 October 1914
- Brig-Gen Sir Hugh Houghton Stewart, 4th Baronet of Athenree, from 25 October 1914 to 29 October 1915
- Brig-Gen G.L. Hibbert, from 29 October 1915; sick 25 August 1916; returned 20 September; to 6 February 1917
- Lt-Col H.A. Thompson, acting 25–27 August 1916
- Brig-Gen Francis Stewart Montague-Bates, temporary from 29 August to 20 September 1916
- Lt-Col Ronald Falconar-Stewart, 12th A&SH, acting 6–8 February 1917
- Brig-Gen W.A. Blake from 8 February to 19 July 1917; returned 7 September 1917 to after Armistice
- Lt-Col G.H.F. Wingate, acting 19 July to 7 September 1917

== 2014–present ==
The first public mention of grouping together various information operations units may have been in a July 2013 update to the Army 2020 reorganisation plan, naming the Security Assistance Group (SAG) and its planned supervision of the Media Operation Group; the MSSG; and 15 Psychological Operations Group. The SAG's mission was to work with multiple central government agencies to achieve the goals of defence engagement and the "Building Stability Overseas" strategy. Brigadier Alastair Aitkin, a Scottish infantryman, was the initial commander, from July 2014 to May 2017. An Army Headquarters Freedom of Information Act answer in November 2014 said the SAG had only been established on 1 September 2014. 77th Brigade was created to draw together a host of existing and developing Army capabilities.

In 2015, the UK government said the brigade's objectives would be similar to those of the SAG. Specifically, it was to:

Provide support to other government departments in the aim to achieve stability overseas; lead on special influence methods; build military capacity in all stages of conflict.

Brigadier Chris Bell was appointed Commander 77 Brigade in May 2017, and Programme Director for Project Castle, which aims to develop a modern career structure in the Army, in December 2018.

In 2019, Laurie Clarke in Wired described the brigade as a "psychological operations unit responsible for 'non-lethal' warfare that reportedly uses social media to "control the narrative", as well as disseminating UK government-friendly podcasts and videos".

Warfare Today says of the brigade that it is a combined regular army and reserve unit "for non-lethal warfare and behavioural influence", based at Denison Barracks, Hermitage, Berkshire.

The SAG aimed to have a full strength of 453 military and civilian personnel and occasionally, personnel from the Foreign and Commonwealth Office, Department for International Development and the Stabilisation Unit may be attached to the Brigade or work with it, of this total there will be 440 military posts in the brigade.

=== Structure ===
==== 2026 ====
In 2026 the brigade was organised as:

- Brigade Operations Centre
- 5th Information Operations Task Force (5IOTF)
- 101 Information Operations Task Force (101 IOTF)
- 6th Military Intelligence Battalion (6MI)
- Specialist Mentoring & Coaching Group (SMCG)

==== Previous structure ====
From 2022 under the Future Soldier programme the structure of the brigade became:

- Brigade Headquarters at Pirbright
  - The Staff Corps
  - Deployable element, 5 IOTF (Information Operations Task-Force)
  - Stand-off, 101 IOTF
  - Honourable Artillery Company
  - 6 Military Intelligence Battalion, Intelligence Corps

Initially designated as the Security Assistance Group, the formation included the following units:

- Headquarters Element
- Media Operations Group (Volunteers) (MOG) - Media Operations
- Security Capacity Building Team (SCBT) - Military Capacity Building
- 15 Psychological Operations Group (15 POG) - Psychological Warfare
- Military Stabilisation Support Group (MSSG) - Stabilisation and Conflict Prevention. The Group was tasked with civil-military work in conflict zones or unstable areas. It was a hybrid unit consisting of both regular and reserve soldiers of all branches of the British armed forces. Under the Army 2020 concept, the MSSG has been placed under the command of the 77th Brigade. The MSSG was led by a colonel and had three detachments and a specialist detachment, each led by a lieutenant colonel. It used to be under the Royal Engineers. It has worked in many UK operations most notably Afghanistan, where it won an award for humanitarian work and helped to win over the population's minds from the Taliban. The MSSG has also helped with conflict prevention in Uganda, Sierra Leone and the Philippines.

In July 2015 and October 2015, the headquarters and four subordinate elements were reshaped into six 'Columns'.

- No.1 Column - Planning support focusing on the behavioural analysis of actors, audiences and adversaries
- No.2 Column - Provided reachback support to deployed operations
- No.3 Column - Provided deployable specialists to other parts of the Armed Forces and other Government organisations
- No.4 Column - Provided professional specialists in Security Capacity Building
- No.5 Column - Media operations and Civil Affairs
- No.7 Column - Engineer and Logistic Staff Corps (Structure formed in October 2015)

There was no No. 6 Column for historical reasons.

=== Activities ===
The Brigade participated in a two-week disaster relief exercise in Bosnia and Herzegovina. It deployed to the Philippines in April 2015 to assist the Philippines Government in developing their contingency plans for natural disasters. 77th Brigade has formed a formal partnership with the 361st Civil Affairs Brigade, US Army Europe.

The Brigade uses social media such as Twitter and Facebook to influence populations and behaviour. David Miller, then a professor of political sociology at the University of Bristol studying British government propaganda and public relations, said that it is "involved in manipulation of the media including using fake online profiles".

In September 2019, Middle East Eye reported that Gordon MacMillan, a Twitter executive with editorial control over the Middle East and North Africa, is also a reservist officer in the 77th Brigade. Both Twitter and the British Army denied that they have a relationship or agreement.

On 22 April 2020, during the UK government's daily coronavirus briefing, General Nick Carter confirmed that 77th Brigade are working with the Home Office Rapid Response Unit "helping to quash rumours from misinformation, but also to counter disinformation".

On 7 May 2020, The Economist interviewed Carter on the role of 77th Brigade in fighting COVID-19 pandemic disinformation. The Defence Cultural Specialist Unit was used to monitor the internet for content on COVID-19 and to look for evidence of disinformation related to COVID-19 vaccines. An army source later told the Mail on Sunday that this involved monitoring of the UK population. A government spokesman stated in response "These units used publicly available data, including material shared on social media platforms, to assess UK disinformation trends and narratives. They did not target individuals or take any action that could impact anyone’s ability to discuss and debate issues freely."

As of 2024, the brigade cooperates with the Department for Science, Innovation and Technology. the Home Office, the National Cyber Force and the National Cyber Security Centre in countering adversarial information activities.

The brigade has made a formal partnership with the Europe based US Army 361st Civil Affairs Brigade.

The brigade's operational cost nearly doubled from 2015 to 2023, from £7.6 million to £14.5 million per year.

== Future ==
Under the Future Soldier programme, the brigade will move to Pirbright Camp in Surrey in 2035.

== See also ==
- Joint Forces Cyber Group
- Joint Threat Research Intelligence Group
- 1st Information Operations Command (Land)
- Land Information Assurance Group
- Psychological warfare
- State-sponsored Internet propaganda
- Mass surveillance
- 56th Theater Information Operations Group
