= Stewart baronets of Athenree (1803) =

Escutcheon of the Stewart baronets of Athenree

The Stewart baronetcy, of Athenree in the County of Tyrone, was created in the Baronetage of the United Kingdom on 21 June 1803 for John Stewart. He was Attorney-General for Ireland from 1799 to 1803 and represented County Tyrone in the British House of Commons. The second Baronet also sat as Member of Parliament for County Tyrone. The sixth Baronet was Deputy Lieutenant of County Tyrone in 1971.

== Stewart baronets, of Athenree (1803) ==
- Sir John Stewart, 1st Baronet (c. 1758–1825)
- Sir Hugh Stewart, 2nd Baronet (1792–1854)
- Sir John Marcus Stewart, 3rd Baronet (1830–1905)
- Sir Hugh Houghton Stewart, 4th Baronet (1858–1942)
- Sir George Powell Stewart, 5th Baronet (1861–1945)
- Sir Hugh Charlie Godfray Stewart, 6th Baronet (1897–1994)
- Sir David John Christopher Stewart, 7th Baronet (1935–2022)
- Sir Hugh Nicholas Stewart, 8th Baronet (b. 1955)

The heir presumptive is the present holder's only son, Kieran Andrew Liam Stewart (born 1979).

== Notes ==
Baronetage of the United Kingdom
Preceded by de Capell-Brooke baronets	Stewart baronets of Athenree; 21 June 1803	Succeeded by Stronge baronets
