= Henry Leycester Croker =

Major-General Sir Henry Leycester Croker KCB CMG
- Born: 17 October 1864; Cheltenham, Gloucestershire, England
- Died: 20 August 1938 (aged 73); Kensington, London, England
- Military career
- Allegiance: United Kingdom
- Branch: British Army
- Service years: 1886–1923
- Rank: Major-General
- Units: Gloucestershire Regiment; Leicestershire Regiment
- Commands: 1st Battalion, Leicestershire Regiment; 81st Infantry Brigade; 28th Division
- Conflicts: Second Boer War; First World War
- Awards: Knight Commander of the Order of the Bath; Companion of the Order of St Michael and St George

Major-General Sir Henry Leycester Croker KCB CMG (17 October 1864 – 20 August 1938) was a British Army officer who served in the Second Boer War and later in the First World War. During the latter he served as a battalion, brigade and division commander, ending the war in 1918 in command of the 28th Division.

== Early life and military career ==
Henry Leycester Croker was born on 17 October 1864, in Cheltenham, Gloucestershire, to Captain Edward Croker of the 17th (Leicestershire) Regiment of Foot, and grandson of Lieutenant Colonel William Croker, also of the 17th (Leicestershire) Regiment of Foot. He received his education at Cheltenham College.

He became a lieutenant in the 4th (Militia) Battalion, Gloucestershire Regiment, on 30 January 1884, and later transferred to the Regular Army as a lieutenant in the Leicestershire Regiment (later the Royal Leicestershire Regiment), his family's regiment, on 28 April 1886.

During the 1890s, Croker served with the 1st Battalion, Leicesters, in the West Indies and North America, and was promoted to captain on 5 February 1894. He was appointed adjutant of the 1st Battalion on 25 November 1899.

== Second Boer War ==
Croker served in South Africa during the Second Boer War, which began in October 1899, participating in operations in Natal from 1899 to 1900, including the action at Talana, the march from Dundee to Ladysmith, the engagement at Lombard's Kop, and the Defence of Ladysmith. He was depicted in Dickinson's and Foster's famous painting, The Defenders of Ladysmith.

He took part in the action at Laing's Nek from June 6 to 9, 1900, and subsequent engagements in Northern Natal and the Transvaal, including Armesfoort, Ermelo, Geluk's Farm, Bergendal, and Badfontein. He was present at the actions at Belfast on 26–27 August 1900, and Lydenberg from 5–8 September 1900.

Croker served under Major General Sir John French in Eastern Transvaal and on the Swaziland border, and under Major General Walter Kitchener at Blood River Valley, South Eastern Transvaal, and Ilangapies. For his services, he was mentioned in despatches three times, awarded the Queen's South Africa Medal with four clasps and the King's South Africa Medal, and promoted brevet major on 22 August 1902.

He was confirmed in the rank of major on 31 May 1904 and was promoted to lieutenant colonel on 1 November 1910.

== First World War ==
During World War I, he commanded the 1st Battalion, Leicesters, on the Western Front from 7 September 1914 to 18 March 1915, during which time his substantive rank was raised to colonel in November 1914, although with seniority backdated to June 1914.

In March 1915 Croker succeeded Colonel Duncan Alwyn Macfarlane in command of the 27th Division's 81st Infantry Brigade, and was granted the temporary rank of brigadier general while employed in this role, leading it in France and later on the Macedonian front when it was sent there in late 1915 until May 1916 when he became general officer commanding of the 28th Division and was promoted to temporary major general. Like his former command, the division was serving in Salonika, and he led it until the end of hostilities in November 1918.

Throughout most of the campaign the 28th would serve mainly under the command of XVI Corps, commanded by Lieutenant General Charles Briggs, Croker's predecessor as GOC of the division, which itself was part of the British Salonika Army, commanded by Lieutenant General George Milne.

Under his leadership, the division saw significant action, operating in the Struma Valley from 1916 to 1917, where they clashed with Bulgarian forces and consolidated positions.

Croker also led the division through the tough fighting of the Second Battle of Doiran in April 1917, where they faced entrenched Bulgarian positions.

He continued to command the division in the latter half of 1918, playing a key role in the Battle of Doiran, part of the final Allied push in the region, shortly before the Armistice with Salonica.

He was wounded and received several honours for his wartime service, including being made a Companion of the Order of the Bath in February 1915 and Order of St Michael and St George, and was six times mentioned in despatches. In November 1918 he was made an Order of the Redeemer, 2nd Class.

== Postwar and final years ==
Croker, whose rank of major general was made substantive in January 1919, "for distinguished service in connection with Military Operations in Salonika", retired from the army in July 1923 and was knighted in June 1926.

He ceased to belong to the army reserve of officers in October 1931 and died nearly seven years later at the age of 73 in Kensington on 20 August 1938 and is buried in Leicester Cathedral.

== Personal life ==
He married Mabel Tedlie in London on 1 June 1897, and had two daughters.
