= XII Corps (United Kingdom) =

- XII Corps formation badge the Second World War
- Active: 1915−1919; 1940−1945
- Country: United Kingdom
- Branch: British Army
- Type: Corps
- Size: c. 115,000 men (Second World War).
- Engagements: First World War; Second World War

Commanders
- Notable commanders: Henry Maitland Wilson; Andrew Thorne; Bernard Montgomery; Montagu Stopford; Neil Ritchie; Sir Gordon MacMillan

XII Corps was a corps of the British Army that fought in the First and Second World Wars. In the First World War, it formed part of the British Salonika Force on the Macedonian front. In the Second World War, it formed part of the British Second Army during Operation Overlord and the subsequent North-West Europe Campaign of 1944-46.

== First World War ==
XII Corps was formed in France on 8 September 1915 under the command of Lieutenant General Henry F. M. Wilson, former commander of the 4th Division.

In November, XII Corps was sent from France with 22nd, 26th and 28th divisions under command to reinforce Allied forces on the Macedonian front. Wilson and his corps headquarters (HQ) arrived at the port of Salonika on 12 November, but Lieutenant General Sir Bryan Mahon, the commander of the British Salonika Force (BSF), took XII Corp's staff to establish his own HQ. On 14 December, the War Office sanctioned the establishment of two corps within the BSF and Wilson reformed XII Corps.

After a period holding the defensive position known as 'the Birdcage' around Salonika, XII Corps moved up-country in July 1916, taking over former French positions, but only part was involved in the fighting during the summer and autumn. XII Corps was selected to attack the Bulgarian positions west of Lake Doiran in April 1917. The area to be attacked was 'a defender's dream, being a tangled mass of hills cut by numerous ravines'. Wilson planned a three-stage operation to capture the three lines of defences, preceded by a short intense bombardment. The BSF's new commander, Lieutenant General George Milne, decided that his manpower was too limited, and reduced this to a smaller assault on the first defence line only, preceded by a three-day bombardment to neutralise enemy batteries and destroy trenches and barbed wire. This, of course, lost the element of surprise and the Bulgarians were well aware of what was coming. Only three brigades were engaged, but the casualties were high and little ground was gained. In a second attack two weeks later, the assault troops managed to cross no man's land, but it was difficult to get information back to HQs, and some companies simply disappeared.

This First Battle of Doiran (second battle by Bulgarian reckoning) had been a failure and, with many troops being withdrawn to other theatres, XII Corps did not get another opportunity to launch a major attack until 18 September 1918. On that day, with two brigades of the 22nd Division and the Greek Seres Division, XII Corps failed to take 'Pip Ridge' and the 'Grande Couronne'. The following day, the attack was renewed with a brigade from the 27th Division supported by the remnants of 22nd Division, the Seres Division, and the French 2nd Regiment of Zouaves. Once more the attack failed with heavy casualties. However, the 2nd Battle of Doiran had served its purpose by drawing Bulgarian attention away from Gen Franchet d'Esperey's main Franco-Serbian thrust, which broke through the Bulgarian lines further west. On 21 September, the BSF was ordered to pursue the retreating Bulgarians, with XII Corps in the lead. Bulgaria signed an armistice with the Allies on 29 September, but XII Corps continued to advance across Bulgaria towards the Turkish frontier, until the Ottoman Turks also signed the Armistice of Mudros on 31 October.

XII Corps occupied parts of European Turkey and Wilson was appointed GOC Allied Forces Gallipoli and Bosporus. On 11 February 1919, XII Corps ceased to exist, Wilson becoming Commander, Allied Forces Turkey in Europe, British Salonika Army, and British Army of the Black Sea.

=== First World War order of battle ===
Order of Battle (March 1917)

- 22nd Division
- 26th Division
- 60th (2/2nd London) Division

Corps Troops:

- 1/1st Lothians and Border Horse

== Second World War ==
=== Home defence ===
XII Corps, which was formed in 1940, came under Commander-in-Chief, Home Forces in the early part of the Second World War. It was based at 10 Broadwater Down in Royal Tunbridge Wells in Kent. Lieutenant-General Sir Bernard Montgomery was its commander from 27 April 1941 until 13 August 1942, when he was sent to Egypt to take command of the British Eighth Army.

Order of Battle, June - October 1940

- 1st London Infantry Division (renamed 56th (London) Infantry Division 18 November 1940)
- 45th Infantry Division
- Royal Artillery
  - 60th (North Midland) Army Field Regiment, Royal Artillery
  - 88th (2nd West Lancashire) Army Field Regiment, Royal Artillery
  - 74th Medium Regiment, Royal Artillery

=== North West Europe ===
XII Corps, now commanded by Lieutenant-General Neil Ritchie, was designated as one of the follow-up corps of the British Second Army, commanded by Lieutenant-General Miles C. Dempsey, and was sent to Normandy, France as part of Operation Overlord, shortly after the Allied invasion of Normandy in June 1944. In July, it took over command of the troops holding the Odon Valley area in July 1944 (previously under command of Lieutenant-General Richard N. O'Connor's VIII Corps). XII Corps then took part in a diversionary action in the area prior to Operation Goodwood (18–20 July 1944), and was then involved in the fighting southwards out of this area in August. XII Corps was the last assignment of the 59th (Staffordshire) Infantry Division prior to the division's disbandment, due to a severe shortage of manpower, in late August.

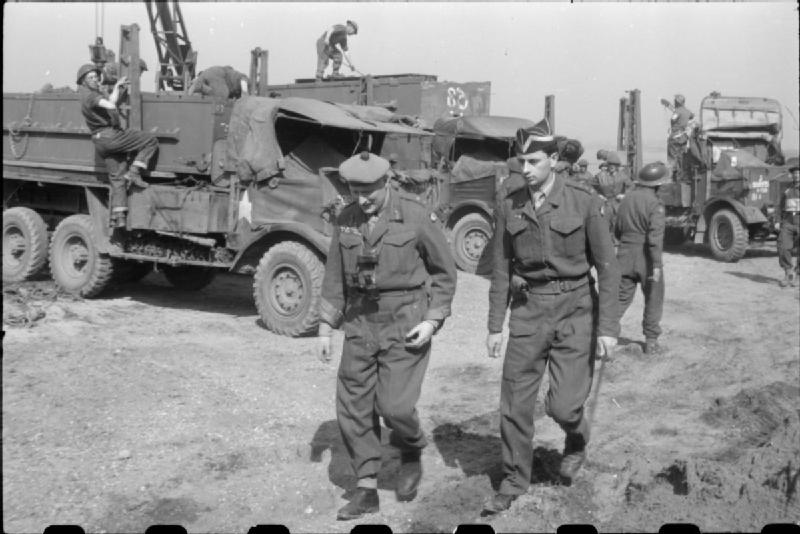
Lieutenant General N. M. Ritchie, GOC XII Corps, with his ADC during an inspection of bridging parties on the Rhine, March 1945.

XII Corps supported the left flank of XXX Corps during Operation Market Garden in September 1944; but, like VIII Corps on the right flank, struggled to match the pace of XXX Corps' rapid advance. This left XXX Corps' flanks exposed to German counter-attacks on its lines of communication. XII Corps later went on to fight in the rest of the campaign, during operations Pheasant, Blackcock and later in the invasion of Germany.

Order of battle, June 1944
General Officer Commanding Lieutenant-General Neil Ritchie
Corps Troops

- 1st The Royal Dragoons (armoured cars)
- 86th (5th Devon) Anti-Tank Regiment, Royal Artillery
- 112th (Durham Light Infantry) Light Anti-Aircraft Regiment, Royal Artillery
- 7th Survey Regiment, Royal Artillery
- XII Corps Troops, Royal Engineers
- XII Corps Postal Unit, Royal Engineers
- XII Corps Signals, Royal Corps of Signals

Attached formations:

- 43rd (Wessex) Infantry Division
- 53rd (Welsh) Infantry Division
- 3rd Army Group, Royal Artillery
  - 6th Field Regiment, RA
  - 13th Medium Regiment, RA
  - 59th (4th West Lancashire) Medium Regiment, RA
  - 67th Medium Regiment, RA
  - 72nd Medium Regiment, RA
  - 59th (Newfoundland) Heavy Regiment, RA

Divisions attached at other times:

- 15th (Scottish) Infantry Division
- 43rd (Wessex) Infantry Division
- 46th Infantry Division
- 52nd (Lowland) Infantry Division
- 56th (London) Infantry Division
- 59th (Staffordshire) Infantry Division

Order of Battle, 14–26 January 1945 (Operation Blackcock)

- 7th Armoured Division
- 52nd (Lowland) Infantry Division
- 43rd (Wessex) Infantry Division
- In support:
  - 8th Armoured Brigade
  - 214th Infantry Brigade
  - 6th Guards Tank Brigade
  - 79th Armoured Division
  - 3rd and 9th AGRA

== General Officers Commanding ==
Commanders included:

- 1915 – 1917 Lieutenant-General Sir Henry Wilson
- 1917 Major-General E. C. W. Mackenzie-Kennedy (temporary)
- 1917 – 1918 Lieutenant-General Sir Henry Wilson
- Jun 1940-Apr 1941 Lieutenant-General Andrew Thorne
- Apr 1941-Nov 1941 Lieutenant-General Bernard Montgomery
- Nov 1941-Sep 1942 Lieutenant-General James Gammell
- Nov 1942-Nov 1943 Lieutenant-General Montagu Stopford
- Dec 1943-May 1945 Lieutenant-General Neil Ritchie
