= Charles Briggs (British Army officer) =

British Army officer

Lieutenant-General Sir Charles Briggs KCB KCMG
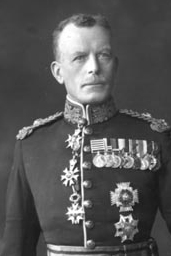
- Sir Charles Briggs, c. 1922
- Born: 22 October 1865; Hylton Castle, Sunderland, England
- Died: 27 November 1941 (aged 76); Wickhambrook, Suffolk, England
- Military career
- Allegiance: United Kingdom
- Branch: British Army
- Service years: 1886–1923
- Rank: Lieutenant General
- Unit: 1st King's Dragoon Guards
- Commands: 1st Imperial Light Horse; Transvaal Volunteers; South Eastern Mounted Brigade; 1st Cavalry Brigade; 3rd Cavalry Division; 28th Division; XVI Corps
- Conflicts: Second Boer War; First World War
- Awards: Knight Commander of the Order of the Bath; Knight Commander of the Order of St Michael and St George

Lieutenant General Sir Charles James Briggs, KCB, KCMG (22 October 1865 – 27 November 1941) was a British Army officer who served as a distinguished brigade, division and corps commander during the First World War, ending the conflict in command of XVI Corps on the difficult and largely overlooked Macedonian front.

== Early life and military career ==
The son of Charles James Briggs, a colonel in the British Army, of Hylton Castle, then in County Durham, the younger Briggs was born on 22 October 1865. He was educated privately in France and Germany before entering the Royal Military College at Sandhurst, Berkshire. It was from here where he received his commission as a subaltern, with the rank of lieutenant, into the 1st Dragoon Guards (later the 1st King's Dragoon Guards) in January 1886.

In February 1892 he was appointed as an extra aide-de-camp to Major-General Sir Frederic Forestier-Walker, then the general officer commanding (GOC) British Troops in Egypt, an appointment he held until the following year. Promoted to captain on 1 March 1893, he became adjutant of his regiment in November 1894 and brigade adjutant of the 4th Cavalry Brigade in April 1897, having been seconded for service from his regiment to serve on the staff. He was awarded the Queen Victoria Diamond Jubilee Medal, in connection with the Diamond Jubilee celebrations in June 1897. All of these appointments "were the mark of a coming man".

== Second Boer War ==
Following the outbreak of the Second Boer War, which began in October 1899, he was appointed brigade major of the 1st Cavalry Brigade, part of the Cavalry Division under Lieutenant General Sir John French. This role marked his "first experience of active service," which would "bring him considerable distinction." By now having moved as brigade major of the 3rd Cavalry Brigade, and although he was wounded at the Battle of Magersfontein in December 1899, he recovered in time to participate in the Relief of Kimberley in February 1900. He was subsequently present for the surrender of Piet Cronjé at the Battle of Paardeberg and joined the British advance on Pretoria, seeing further action at Poplar Grove, Driefontein, Karee Siding, and the Zand River, as well as the Battle of Diamond Hill in June 1900.

In the later stages of the conflict, Briggs transitioned from staff work to field command, leading the 1st Imperial Light Horse from 1901 to 1902 and later commanding a mobile column. Recognized for his "skill and daring" against Boer forces, he was promoted to the brevet rank of major, dated 29 November 1900.

== Inter-war years ==
For his services during the war, which came to an end in May 1902 due to the Treaty of Vereeniging, he received a brevet promotion to lieutenant colonel on 26 June 1902, soon after the war ended, in the South African Honours List. He was also promoted to the substantive rank of major, backdated to 14 June 1902. For his service in the conflict, Briggs was mentioned in dispatches twice and awarded the Queen's South Africa Medal with five clasps and the King's South Africa Medal with two clasps.

With the war now over, he left Cape Town on the SS Sicilia and returned to Southampton, Hampshire, in late July. Reported to be medically unfit for foreign service after his return from the war, he was on 1 November appointed in command of a provisional regiment of lancers, then stationed at Ballincollig, Ireland. He transferred as a major to the 6th Dragoons in July 1904 "usually the sign of someone being fast-tracked for promotion", and was promoted to lieutenant colonel in May 1905, while serving on half-pay.

Briggs returned to South Africa later in 1905 to serve as commander of the Transvaal Volunteers. While serving in this role, he played a prominent role in suppressing the Bambatha Rebellion of 1906. For his leadership, he was promoted to brevet colonel in September 1906. He was also mentioned in despatches and awarded the Natal Native Rebellion Medal with the '1906' clasp. After ceasing to command the volunteers in May 1908, and after returning to Britain, he was once more placed on half-pay. He was promoted to substantive colonel in July.

He returned to normal pay and active service in November 1910 when he was appointed to command the South Eastern Mounted Brigade of the newly created Territorial Force (TF). Briggs commanded the Blue Cavalry in the Army Manoeuvres of 1912, during which it "was Briggs who persuaded a somewhat reluctant Grierson to employ aircraft for reconnaissance, allowing Grierson to worst his rival, Douglas Haig. This may not have been a wise career move". In May 1913 he relinquished command of his TF brigade and took over as general officer commanding (GOC) of the 1st Cavalry Brigade, a Regular Army formation, in succession to Colonel Charles Kavanagh. He was raised to the temporary rank of brigadier general while employed in this role. In January 1914 he was made a Companion of the Order of the Bath (CB) in the 1914 New Year Honours.

== First World War ==
=== France and Belgium ===
Still GOC after the British entry into World War I in August 1914, Briggs led his brigade, which now formed part of Major General Edmund Allenby's Cavalry Division (later the 1st Cavalry Division) to France later that month with the first elements of the British Expeditionary Force (BEF).

While participating in the retreat from Mons, Briggs and his brigade saw action during the engagement at Néry on 1 September. Throughout this important skirmish, his brigade—supported notably by "L" Battery of the Royal Horse Artillery—successfully repelled an assault by the German 4th Cavalry Division and managed to maintain his position until reinforcements reached the area to support his defence.

During the Battle of the Aisne on 14 September, he directed the regiments which constituted his brigade "with great energy and skill" near Chavonne to secure the exposed flank of the 2nd Division. His brigade was later engaged at Messines, Belgium, during the First Battle of Ypres, where both the brigade and its commander received further recognition for their performance.

In February 1915, Briggs was promoted "for services rendered in connection with Operations in the Field" to the rank of major general, for his distinguished conduct in the war so far. He remained in command of his 1st Cavalry Brigade until 7 May, when he succeeded Major General The Hon. Julian Byng as GOC of the 3rd Cavalry Division.

Under his command, the division participated in the Second Battle of Ypres, specifically during the Battle of Frezenberg Ridge. He later led them through the Battle of Hooge in June, where Briggs's men held the line as dismounted infantry following a German flamethrower attack. The final engagement during Briggs's tenure as GOC occurred during the Battle of Loos in September, where the division provided "excellent service", despite seeing no major action during the offensive.

=== Macedonia ===
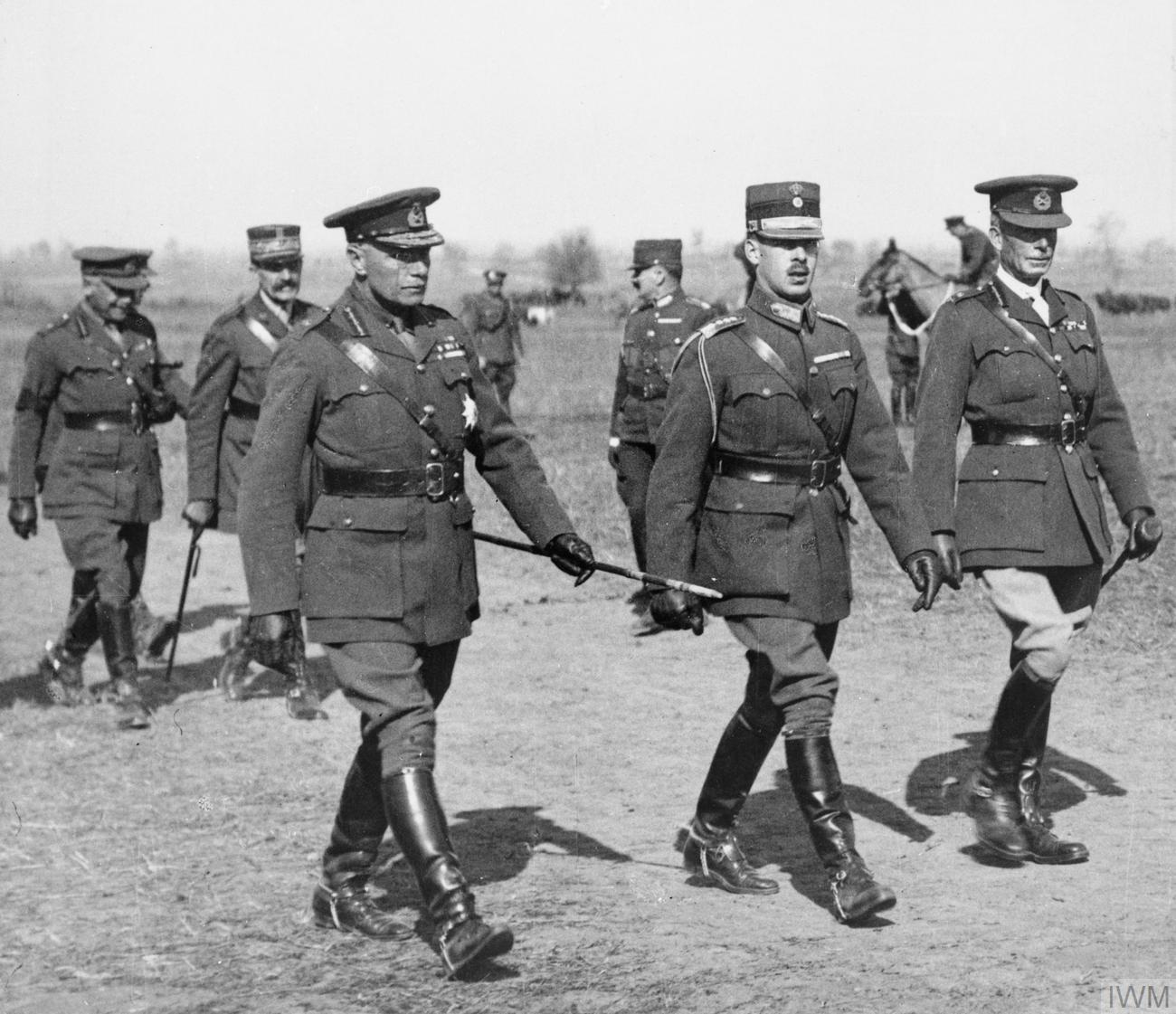
From left to right: Lieutenant General George Milne with King Alexander I of Greece and Lieutenant General Charles Briggs, c. 1917.

On 13 October, Briggs relinquished command of the division to Major General John Vaughan and succeeded Major General Edward Bulfin as GOC of the 28th Division, which had also fought at Loos. Shortly after this, Briggs received orders to move his division to the Balkans, where a new front was being opened. Following a brief period refitting in Egypt, the division's arrival on the Macedonian front was completed by January 1916. Both Briggs and his 28th Division remained in this theatre for the duration of the war, although he would not lead the division in combat while serving in this so-called "malarial backwater."

In May 1916, Briggs was promoted to temporary lieutenant general and appointed GOC of XVI Corps. He took over from Lieutenant General George Milne, who had moved up to succeed Lieutenant General Sir Bryan Mahon as commander-in-chief (C-in-C) of the British Salonika Army. Under Briggs, the corps held the eastern sector along the Struma Valley, where the struggle against malaria often proved as taxing as combat itself. In January 1917 his CB, awarded three years earlier, was upgraded to a KCB, making him Sir Charles. In May he was made a Commander of the Legion of Honour by the government of France. Throughout most of 1917, he directed a series of aggressive localized raids at Homondos, Bairakli, and Kumli to pin down Bulgarian forces and maintain a secure outpost line.

He was made a Knight Commander of the Order of St Michael and St George (KCMG) in January 1918. His command culminated in the final Allied offensive of September 1918. During the breakthrough, Briggs's XVI Corps launched critical diversionary attacks near Lake Doiran and the Struma River, which successfully prevented the Bulgarian Second Army from shifting reinforcements to the main point of attack. These actions contributed to the general collapse of the Bulgarian front and the subsequent Armistice of Salonica, which knocked Bulgaria out of the war. Shortly after this, he was appointed a Grand Commander of the Order of the Redeemer by the Greece.

== Post-war and retirement ==
In January 1919, Briggs was promoted to the substantive rank of lieutenant general as a reward "for distinguished service in connection with Military Operations in Salonika". He relinquished command of XVI Corps in February in order to become chief of the British military mission to South Russia, serving as the primary liaison to Lieutenant-General Anton Denikin, C-in-C of the Armed Forces of South Russia. During this tenure, he oversaw the coordination of British technical assistance and supplies for the White Army during the Russian Civil War. He relinquished this assignment in June and returned to Britain, remaining on special duty at the War Office in London.

He was heavily decorated by various foreign nations for his services both during and after the war; in June 1919 he was appointed a Grand Officer of the Order of the White Eagle with Swords (Serbia) and the Order of the White Eagle (Russia); he was awarded the War Cross with Palm (Greece) in July, and in August the Medal of Military Merit, 1st Class (Greece).

He remained in this post until his retirement from the army in February 1923, bringing an end to his military career which had begun nearly forty years earlier.

In retirement, he served as colonel of his old regiment, the 1st King's Dragoon Guards, from 16 March 1926, when he took over from Major General William Vesey Brownlow. He held this position throughout the remainder of the interwar period until finally relinquishing the role on 31 December 1939, almost four months after the outbreak of the next Second World War.

== Personal life ==
Briggs married Rosamund Daphne Ryder, the second daughter of Mr C. F. Ryder of the Hall, Thurlow, Suffolk, with whom he had a daughter. He died at the age of 76 on 27 November 1941 at his home, the Manor House in Wickhambrook, near Newmarket, Suffolk.

Military offices
Preceded by Charles Kavanagh	GOC 1st Cavalry Brigade; 1913–1915	Succeeded by Ernest Makins
Preceded by The Hon. Julian Byng	GOC 3rd Cavalry Division; May–October 1915	Succeeded by John Vaughan
Preceded by Edward Bulfin	GOC 28th Division; 1915–1916	Succeeded by Henry Croker
Preceded by George Milne	GOC XVI Corps; 1916–1919	Succeeded by Post disbanded
Honorary titles
Preceded by William Vesey Brownlow	Colonel of the 1st King's Dragoon Guards; 1926–1939	Succeeded by The Lord Gowrie
