= General Cotton =

General Cotton may refer to:

- Anthony J. Cotton (fl. 1980s–2020s), U.S. Air Force four-star general
- Arthur Stedman Cotton (1873–1952), British Army brigadier general
- Arthur Cotton (1803–1899), British Army general
- Stapleton Cotton, 1st Viscount Combermere (1773–1865), British Army general
- Sydney Cotton (1792–1874), British Army lieutenant general
- Willoughby Cotton (1783–1860), British Army lieutenant general
