= Arthur Cotton (disambiguation) =

Sir Arthur Cotton (1803–1899) was a British general in India.

Arthur Cotton may also refer to:

- Arthur Cotton (politician) (1853–1920), Australian politician in Tasmania
- Arthur Stedman Cotton (1873–1952), British artillery general
- Arthur Disbrowe Cotton (1879–1962), British botanist
