= Baron Milne =

Barony in the Peerage of the United Kingdom

Baron Milne, of Salonika and of Rubislaw in the County of Aberdeen, is a title in the Peerage of the United Kingdom. It was created on 26 January 1933 for Field Marshal Sir George Milne. He had previously served as Chief of the Imperial General Staff. As of 2009 the title is held by his grandson, the third Baron, who succeeded his father in 2005.

== Barons Milne (1933) ==
- George Francis Milne, 1st Baron Milne (1866–1948)
- George Douglass Milne, 2nd Baron Milne (1909–2005)
- George Alexander Milne, 3rd Baron Milne (b. 1941). Lord Milne is an antiquarian, a Freeman of the City of London and a Liveryman of the Worshipful Company of Grocers.

The heir presumptive is the present holder's brother, the Honourable Iain Charles Luis Milne FCA (b. 1949)

The heir presumptive's heir apparent is his elder son Iain Eduardo Alexander Milne (b. 1990).

== Arms ==
Coat of arms of Baron Milne
Crest A dexter hand holding up an open book Proper, leaved Or. Escutcheon Or, a cross moline pierced lozengeways of the field between four mullets Azure. Supporters Dexter, an officer of the Royal Horse Artillery; sinister, an officer of the Greek Evzone Guard, both in full dress uniform. Motto Efficiunt Clarum Studia (Studies Make Illustrious)
