= XVI Corps (United Kingdom) =

- Active: World War I
- Country: United Kingdom
- Branch: British Army
- Type: Field corps
- Part of: British Salonika Army
- Engagements: World War I: Balkans Campaign; Battle of Doiran

The British XVI Corps was a British infantry corps during World War I. During World War II the identity was recreated for deceptive purposes.

== History ==
British XVI Corps was formed in Salonika in January 1916 under Lieutenant General George Milne. Milne was starved of resources by Sir William Robertson who considered all operations outside the Western Front to be "side shows". The Corps Headquarters were at Kirechkoi to the east of Thessaloniki from January 1916 until the advance to the Struma in September 1916. From May 1916 it was one of two corps within the British Salonika Army. The campaign developed into a battle for position with trenches and emplacements from which the General Officer Commanding (Lieutenant-General Charles Briggs) undertook limited actions to capture Bulgarian and Turkish positions in a river valley that was infested with mosquitos. British operations in the Balkans Campaign were costly: the allies lost over 7,000 troops at the Battle of Doiran in September 1918 alone.

== Component units ==
Component units included:

British XVI Corps

- 10th (Irish) Division
- British 27th Division
- British 28th Division
- 1/1st Surrey Yeomanry

== Second World War ==
In World War II the British XVI Corps was notionally reformed as part of the British Twelfth Army, a fictitious formation created under Operation Cascade. The formation insignia was a phoenix arising from red flames and bearing a flaming torch in its mouth, on a white ground.

=== Subordinate units ===
As initially created, the corps contained the following divisions in addition to the usual supporting troops:

- British 8th Armored Division (fictional)
- British 15th Motorized Division (fictional)
- British 34th Infantry Division (fictional)

== General Officers Commanding ==
Commanders included:

- January 1916 – May 1916 Lieutenant-General George Milne
- May 1916 – November 1918 Lieutenant-General Charles Briggs
