= 3rd Brigade, Royal Field Artillery =

- Active: August 1914 - 1918
- Country: United Kingdom
- Branch: British Army
- Type: Field Artillery
- Size: Brigade
- Part of: 3rd (Lahore) Division; 28th Division

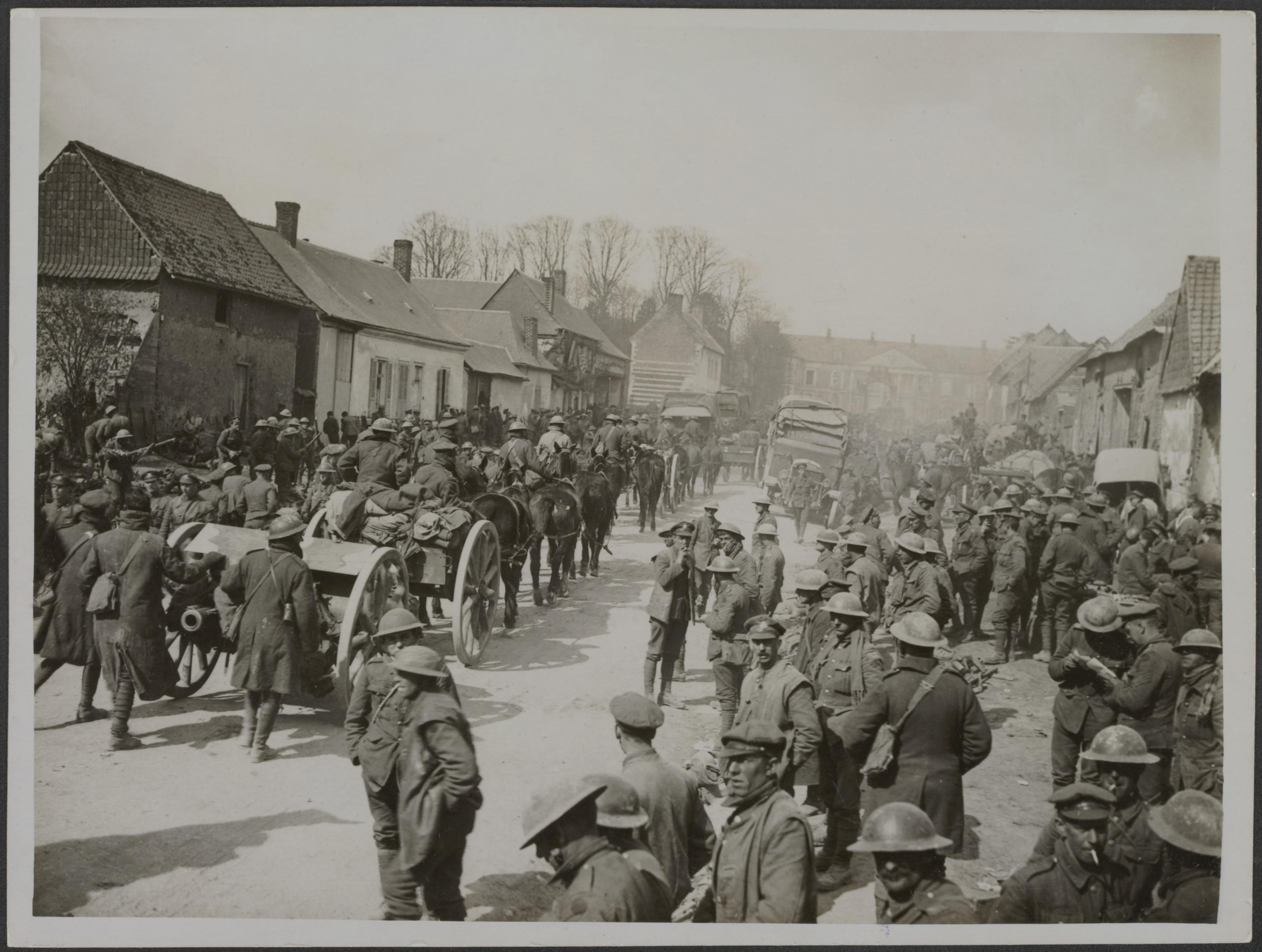
Royal Field Artillery

The 3rd Brigade, Royal Field Artillery was a regiment–sized unit that was formed in August 1914 and served in World War I.

== History ==
The 3rd Brigade was originally formed in August 1914, just after the outbreak of World War I. (Note: Was "Officially" formed on mobilization because batteries were separate units.) It was created in Jullundur, India from the merger of 18 Battery, 62 Battery, and 75 Battery. The individual batteries were, before the war, a part of the 3rd (Lahore) Division. Shortly after its formation, the regiment moved to Peshawar, from where it was ordered to England. Upon arrival in England in November 1914. The brigade was restructured at Winchester, where for a short time it was called CXLVI Brigade. By the end of the restructuring, 75 Battery had left the brigade and 365 Battery had taken its place.

The regiment then joined the 28th Infantry Division and was first deployed to France for the remainder of the year, before being moved to Thessaloniki, Greece, in 1915. In February, 22 Battery of XXXIV Brigade joined the brigade for a short period of time before being removed. After a duration of minimal action for the brigade, D Battery of CXLVI Brigade joined the unit and became D (Howitzer) Battery. In August, 365 Battery was broken up and parts of the battery joined 18 and 64 Batteries. At the end of the war the brigade consisted of 18, 62, and D (Howitzer) Batteries.

== Organization ==
At the time of World War I, Royal Field Artillery regiments were designated as brigades, which consisted of three artillery batteries merged. Each brigade would use only one type of artillery gun. In addition to the three batteries, each brigade also contained an ammunition column and base depot. The column consisted of 158 officers and men and controlled the movement of all artillery, supplies, and security groups. The depot consisted of a junior officer, two sergeants, and 40 enlisted men held in reserve as casualty replacements or storemen.
