= Edward Bulfin =

British Army general (1862-1939)

General Sir Edward Bulfin KCB CVO
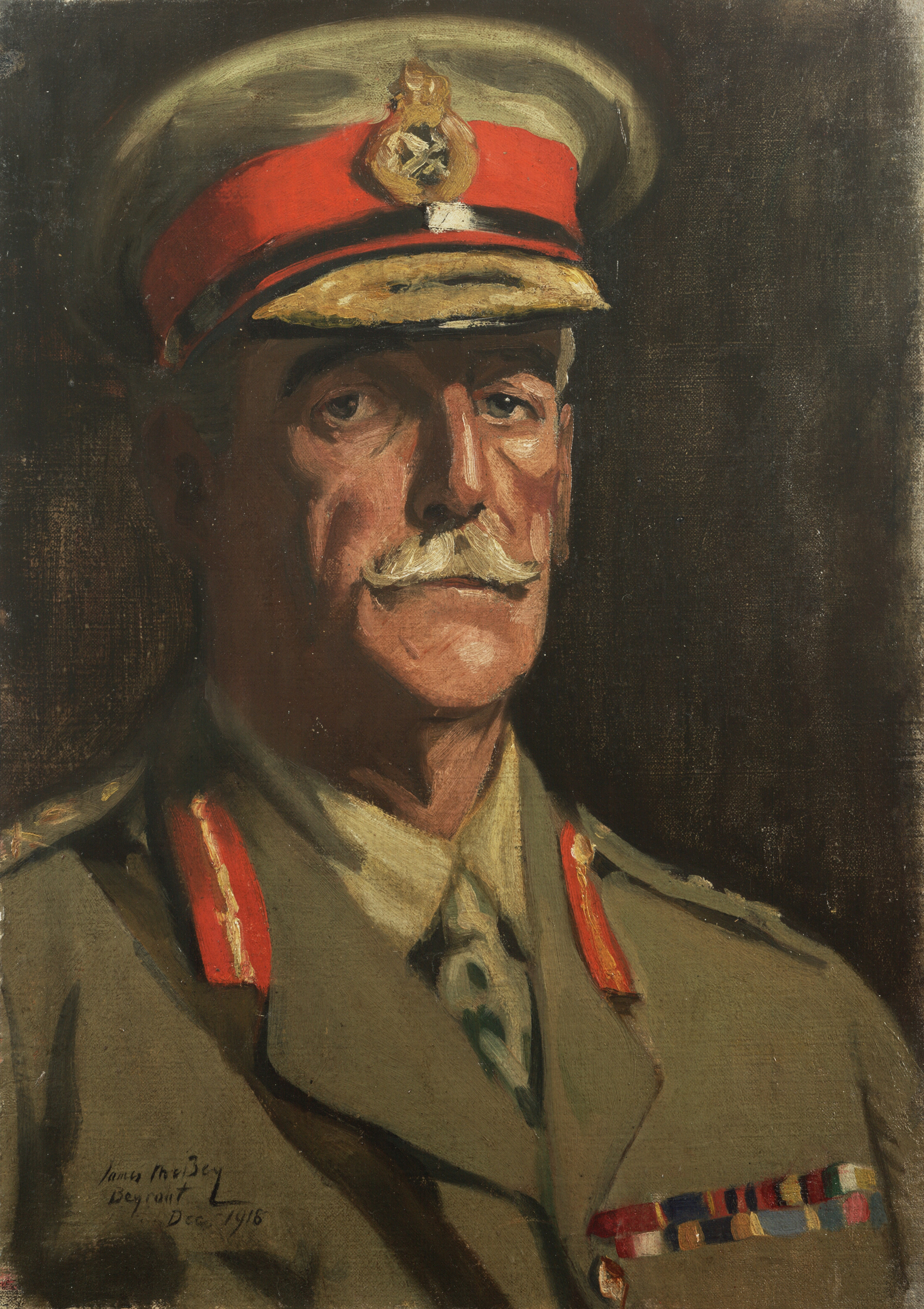
- Born: 6 November 1862; Rathfarnham, Ireland
- Died: 20 August 1939 (aged 76); Boscombe, Bournemouth, England
- Burial place: Wimborne Road Cemetery, Bournemouth
- Military career
- Allegiance: United Kingdom
- Branch: British Army
- Service years: 1884–1926
- Rank: General
- Units: Royal Irish Fusiliers; Green Howards
- Commands: XXI Corps; 60th (2/2nd London) Division; 28th Division; 2nd Brigade; Essex Brigade
- Conflicts: Second Boer War; Battle of Belmont; Battle of Graspan; Battle of Modder River; Battle of Magersfontein; First World War; Western Front; First Battle of Ypres; Second Battle of Ypres; Battle of Loos; Sinai and Palestine campaign; Third Battle of Gaza; Battle of Megiddo
- Awards: Knight Commander of the Order of the Bath; Commander of the Royal Victorian Order; Knight Commander of the Equestrian Order of the Holy Sepulchre (Holy See)

General Sir Edward Stanislaus Bulfin, KCB, CVO (6 November 1862 − 20 August 1939) was a British Army general during the First World War, where he established a reputation as an excellent commander at the brigade, divisional and corps levels. He was most noted for his actions during the First Battle of Ypres, when he organized impromptu forces to slow down the German assault. In 1917–18 he commanded the XXI Corps in the Sinai and Palestine campaign.

== Early life ==
Bulfin was born at Woodtown Park, Rathfarnham, County Dublin, the second son of Patrick Bulfin and Teresa Clare Carroll. His father was a son of Edward Bulfin from Derrinlough, King's County (now County Offaly), and was elected Lord Mayor of Dublin in 1871. He was educated at Stonyhurst College, and then at Kensington Catholic Public School. Although he attended Trinity College, Dublin, he did not take a degree, choosing a military career instead.

== Military career ==
From Dublin University he entered the Armagh Militia from where he was commissioned into the Princess of Wales's Own (Yorkshire Regiment) in November 1884, following militia service with the Royal Irish Fusiliers. He was dispatched to India on 31 December 1889, and first saw active service in Burma in that year. He was promoted to captain on 30 January 1895. In 1898, after returning to England, he was appointed Garrison Adjutant at Dover, and in November embarked for South Africa with his fellow Irishman General Sir William Butler, as Assistant Military Secretary.

When the Second Boer War broke out, in 1899 he was appointed brigade major to the 9th Brigade. He saw action at several skirmishes in South Africa, and was promoted to a brevet major in November 1900. He was present at several battles including Belmont and Graspan, Modder River, Magersfontein, Rhenoster and Lindley. He returned to the regular rank of captain in his regiment on 12 December 1901, and served in South Africa until the end of the war, when he left Cape Town on board the SS Walmer Castle in late June 1902, arriving at Southampton the following month.

On his return to England he received a brevet promotion to lieutenant colonel in the South Africa honours list published on 26 June 1902, and abandoned regimental soldiering in favour of a staff career. From October 1902 to 1904, he served as deputy assistant adjutant-general (DAAG) with the 2nd Division, 1st Army Corps, and on 28 November 1903 he received the substantive rank of major. From November 1906 he served as assistant adjutant and quartermaster general (AA&QMG) for Cape Colony, in succession to Colonel Nevil Macready, and for which he was promoted to brevet colonel. While serving in this assignment he was promoted to colonel in July 1908.

After returning to England "his career took a major step forward", as he was given command of the Essex Infantry Brigade, an unusual appointment as Bulfin had never commanded a battalion. In June 1913 he was appointed a Companion of the Order of the Bath (CB) in the 1913 Birthday Honours, "proof that he was well established". In late June he was promoted again, this time to the temporary rank of brigadier general, and appointed to the prestigious command of the 2nd Infantry Brigade, taking over from Major General Thomas Morland.

From 1914 to 1939 he was regimental colonel of Alexandra, Princess of Wales's Own (Yorkshire Regiment).

== First World War ==
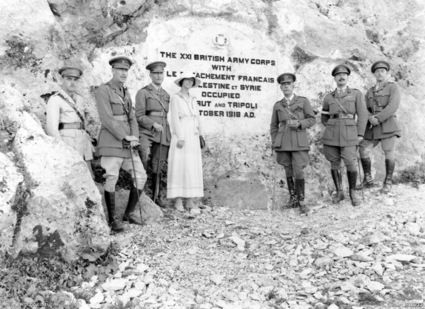
Senior officers at the Commemorative stela of Nahr el-Kalb, near the stone tablet recording the occupation of Beirut and Tripoli. Bulfin is stood, third from the right.

On the outbreak of the First World War in August 1914, Bulfin and the 2nd Brigade were transported to the Western Front as part of the original British Expeditionary Force (BEF). During the fighting around Ypres at the end of October 1914, he organized an impromptu force of six battalions (known as "Bulfin's force") and led a counterattack to stem the German advance. This action won him considerable praise from the general officer commanding (GOC) of I Corps, Lieutenant General Sir Douglas Haig, as well as the commander of the BEF, Field Marshal Sir John French. It was during this time that Bulfin was appointed colonel of his old regiment, the Green Howards, taking over from Lieutenant General Sir William Franklyn.

In December, Bulfin, promoted to major general in October, was made GOC of the newly formed 28th Division, and led this formation through the heavy German gas attacks at the Second Battle of Ypres, and also at the Battle of Loos in the latter part of the year. Bulfin fell ill in October 1915, and was relieved of his command by Hubert Gough (GOC I Corps), and spent the first half of 1916 recuperating in England, thus avoiding a transfer to Salonika, a fate which befell his division, now commanded by Major General Charles James Briggs, just weeks after Bulfin returned home.

He returned to the Western Front in June 1916, six months after having become GOC of the 60th (2/2nd London) Division during the Battle of the Somme, although the division did not play a significant role in the offensive.

=== Salonika and Palestine ===
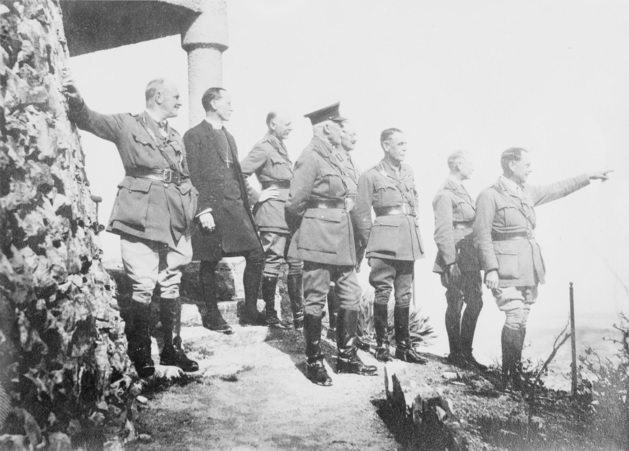
Bulfin, third from right, with other generals on the Mount of Olives, Jerusalem, 19 March 1918

In December 1916, the 60th Division was transferred to Salonika, although they remained for only six months and took part in no serious fighting.

Moving to Palestine in June 1917, Bulfin was promoted in August to temporary lieutenant general and given command of XXI Corps. He proved a capable corps commander, leading his formation through Ottoman defenses at the Third Battle of Gaza, opening the way for the capture of Jerusalem. He later commanded the corps in the overwhelming victory at the Battle of Megiddo in the waning days of the war.

== Post war ==
After the armistice, Bulfin, promoted to the permanent rank of lieutenant general on 1 January 1919, remained in the army in a variety of staff positions, gaining a promotion to full general in May 1925 and finally retiring in January 1926. His first position was to remain in the Middle East and Egypt in particular. During the Egyptian revolution of 1919 he was known to be a very effective military leader in putting down the unrest especially through organising 'flying columns'. In the summer of 1920 he was offered the job of Chief of Police and Head of Secret Intelligence in Ireland based on his loyalty to the Crown, his Irish origins and his swift handling of the nationalist unrest in Egypt in 1919. Bulfin refused the appointment on the grounds that as a Catholic and an Irishman it would be distasteful to him to do any work which was not of a purely military character.

Bufin wrote the foreword to Philip Hugh Dalbiac's History of the 60th Division (2/2nd London Division).

He died of heart failure at the age of 76 at his home in Boscombe, Bournemouth, Dorset, on 20 August 1939, shortly before the beginning of the Second World War. He was buried "in an easily missed corner" at Wimborne Road Cemetery, Bournemouth, close to the graves of two of his sisters. On the unpretentious headstone, above his name and decorations, is inscribed 'Here sleepeth until the great reveille sounds'."

== Family ==
Bulfin married Mary Frances Lonergan in 1898 (immediately prior to posting to South Africa), with whom he had two children.

== Arms ==
Coat of arms of Edward Bulfin

Notes
Confirmed 19 June 1916 by George James Burtchaell, Deputy Ulster King of Arms.
Crest
A demi-lion Or holding in the dexter paw a sword passing through a civic crown as in the arms and charged on the shoulder with a trefoil slipped Vert.
Torse
Of the colours.
Escutcheon
Bendy of six Or and Vert on a chief Ermine between two bees Proper a sword in bend sinister blade upwards also Proper passing through a civic crown of the second resting on the hilt.
Motto
Vincit Veritas

== Bibliography ==
- Davies, Frank; Maddocks, Graham (2014) [1995]. Bloody Red Tabs: General Officer Casualties of the Great War 1914–1918. Pen and Sword Books. ISBN 978-1-78346-237-7.
- Jeffery, Keith (1997). An Irish Empire?: Aspects of Ireland and the British Empire. Manchester: Manchester University Press. ISBN 0719038731.
- Powell, John (2018). Haig's Tower of Strength: General Sir Edward Bulfin-Ireland's Forgotten General. Pen and Sword Books. ISBN 978-1526722607.

Honorary titles
Preceded by Sir William Franklyn	Colonel of Alexandra Princess of Wales's Own (Yorkshire Regiment); 1914–1939	Succeeded by Harold Franklyn
Military offices
New command	GOC 28th Division; 1914–1915	Succeeded by Charles James Briggs
Preceded by Thomas Calley	GOC 60th (2/2nd London) Division; 1915–1917	Succeeded by John Shea
