= British Salonika Army =

British Salonika Force British Salonika Army
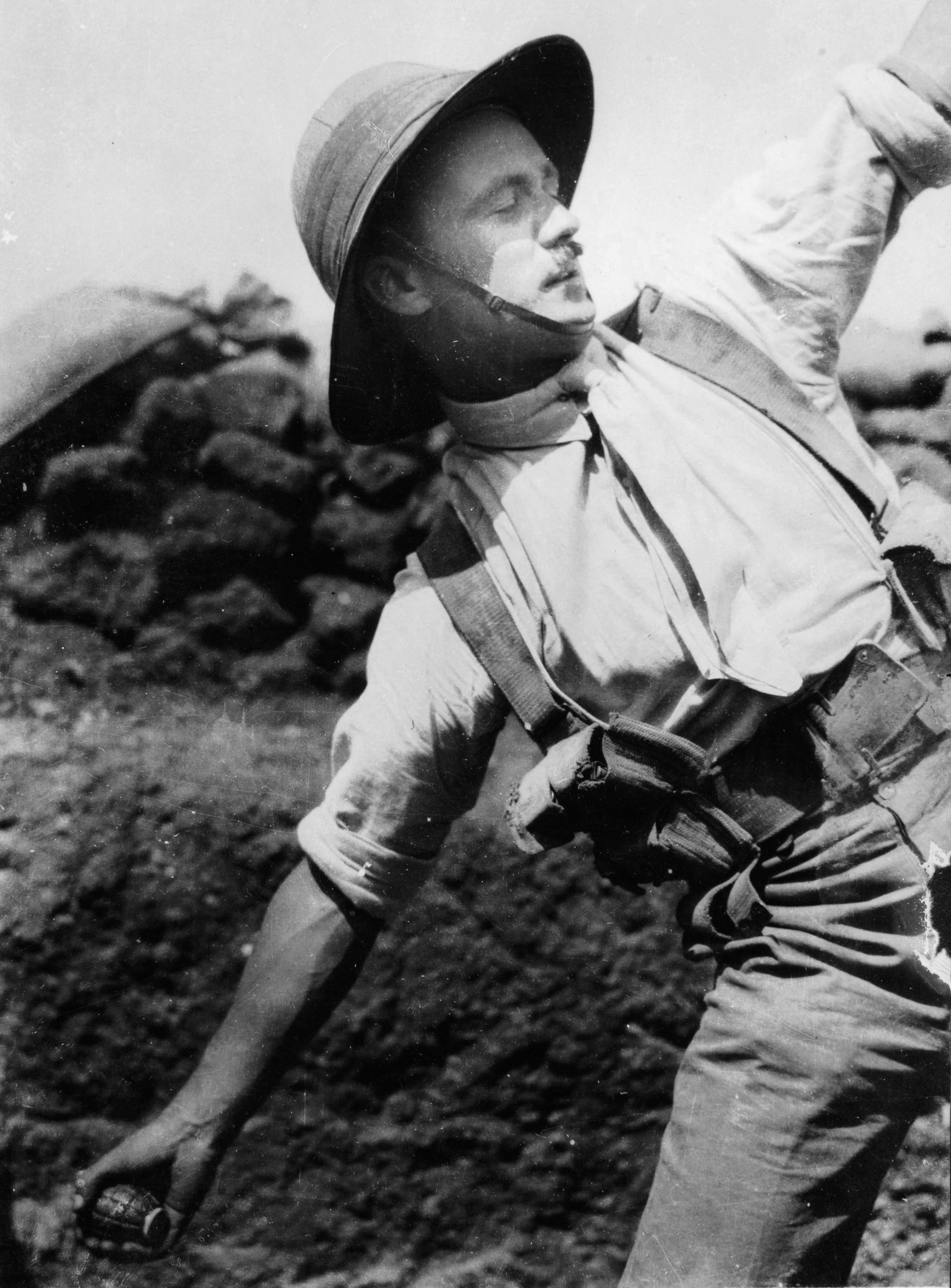
- An officer of the British Salonika Army demonstrating how to throw a Mills bomb
- Active: World War I
- Country: United Kingdom
- Branch: British Army
- Type: Field army

The British Salonika Army was a field army of the British Army during World War I. After the armistice in November 1918, it was disbanded, but component units became the newly formed Army of the Black Sea, and General Milne remained in command.

== First World War ==
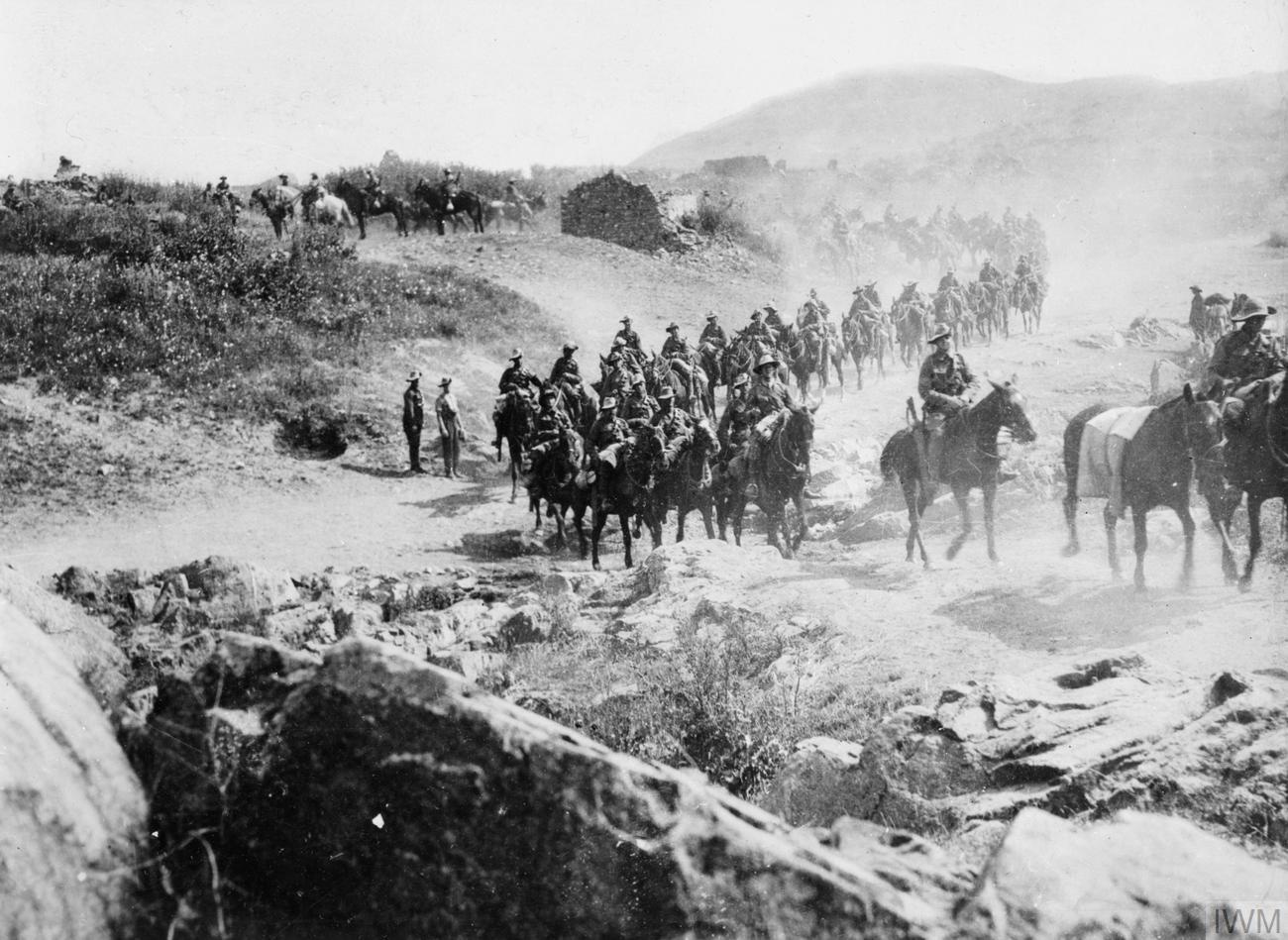
Men of the Middlesex Yeomanry move down a winding dirt track into the Struma Valley during the summer of 1916.

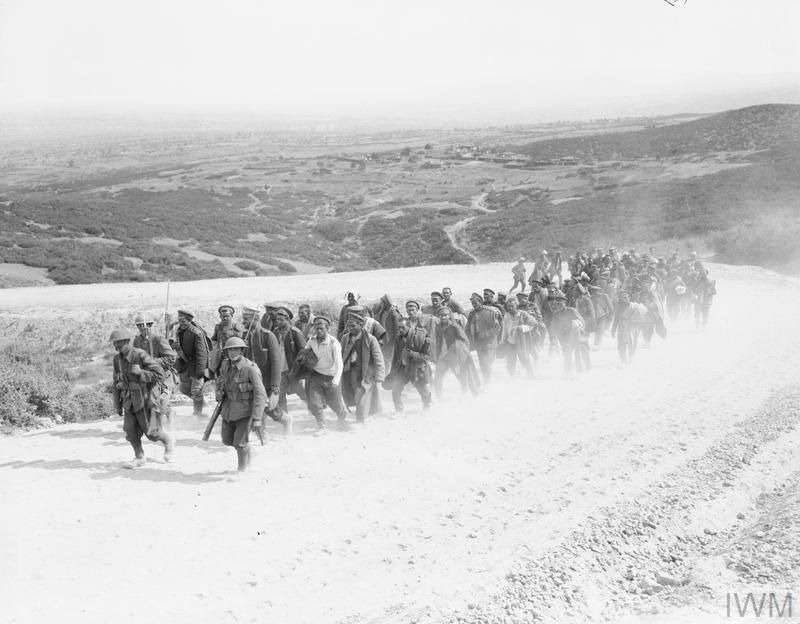
Bulgarians captured during the action of the Karajakois and the capture of Yenikoi, 30th September - 4th October, 1916. 26th and 10th Divisions.

The Army was formed in Salonika under Lieutenant-General Sir Bryan Mahon to oppose Bulgarian advances in the region as part of the Macedonian front. The army arrived in Salonika (along with French troops) on 15 October 1915. In May 1916 Lieutenant-General George Milne replaced Mahon as commander of the Army. It eventually comprised two corps and as the Army of the Black Sea remained in place until 1921.

The dead of the British Salonika Army are commemorated by the Doiran Memorial.

== Component units ==
British Salonika Force, March 1917

XII Corps

- 22nd Division
- 26th Division
- 60th (2/2nd London) Division
- 1/1st Lothians and Border Horse

XVI Corps

- 10th (Irish) Division
- 27th Division
- 28th Division
- 1/1st Surrey Yeomanry

GHQ Troops

- 7th Mounted Brigade
- 8th Mounted Brigade
- 16th Wing, Royal Flying Corps

== Commanders-in-Chief ==
Commanders:

- 4 November 1915 – 15 November 1915: General Charles C. Monro (concurrent with being Commander, Mediterranean Expeditionary Force)
- 15 November 1915 – 9 May 1916: Lieutenant-General Bryan Mahon
- 9 May 1916 – 3 January 1917: Lieutenant-General George Milne
- 3 January 1917 – 11 January 1917: Lieutenant-General Henry Wilson (temporary)
- 11 January 1917 – September 1918: General George Milne
- February 1919 – November 1920: Lieutenant-General Henry Wilson (concurrent with being Commander, Allied Forces in Constantinople)
- November 1920: Lieutenant-General Sir Charles Harington (continued after 1921 as GOC-in-C Allied Forces of Occupation, Turkey)

== Bibliography ==
- Heathcote, T.A. (1999). The British Field Marshals 1736–1997. Barnsley: Pen & Sword Books. ISBN 0-85052-696-5.
