= 81st Brigade (United Kingdom) =

Military unit

The 81st Brigade was a formation of the British Army. It was originally formed from regular army battalions serving away from home in the British Empire. It was assigned to the 27th Division and served on the Western Front and the Macedonian Front during the First World War.

== Formation ==
The infantry battalions did not all serve at once, but all were assigned to the brigade during the war.

- 1st Battalion, Royal Scots
- 2nd Battalion, Gloucestershire Regiment
- 2nd Battalion, Queen's Own Cameron Highlanders
- 1st Battalion, Argyll & Sutherland Highlanders
- 1/9th Battalion, Royal Scots
- 1/9th Battalion, Argyll & Sutherland Highlanders
- 13th Battalion, Black Watch
- 81st Machine Gun Company
- 81st SAA Section Ammunition Column
- 81st Trench Mortar Battery
