= Arthur Stedman Cotton =

British Army officer

Brigadier-General Arthur Stedman Cotton CB CMG CBE DSO AM
- Born: 18 August 1873
- Died: 13 September 1952 (aged 79)
- Military career
- Allegiance: United Kingdom
- Branch: British Army
- Service years: 1893–1930
- Rank: Brigadier-General
- Conflicts: Boxer Rebellion; First World War; Russian Civil War
- Awards: Companion of the Order of the Bath; Companion of the Order of St Michael and St George; Commander of the Order of the British Empire; Distinguished Service Order; Albert Medal; Mentioned in Despatches (9); Croix de guerre (France); Croix de guerre (Belgium); Order of St Maurice and St Lazarus (Italy); Order of St Vladimir (Russia)

Brigadier-General Arthur Stedman Cotton, CB, CMG, CBE, DSO, AM (18 August 1873 – 13 September 1952) was a British Army officer.

== Early life and career ==
Cotton was the son of Major J. W. M. Cotton of Regent's Park, London. He was educated at Merchant Taylors' School and the Royal Military Academy, Woolwich, from which he was commissioned second lieutenant in the Royal Artillery on 11 September 1893. He was promoted lieutenant on 14 September 1896, captain on 28 July 1900, and major on 24 September 1910. He served in the Boxer Rebellion in 1900.

== First World War and Russian Civil War ==
During the First World War, Cotton served on the Western Front with the 2nd Division, 5th Division, 32nd Division, and 41st Division. He was wounded three times, mentioned in despatches nine times, and awarded the Distinguished Service Order (DSO) in 1915. He was promoted to the temporary rank of lieutenant-colonel on 13 October 1915 and was made a substantive lieutenant-colonel in 1916. He was appointed Brigadier-General, Royal Artillery (BGRA; i.e. the divisional artillery commander) of 41st Division on 12 October 1917 and served in this post until 14 April 1919. On 3 June 1919, he was promoted brevet colonel for his war service.

In 1919, he served as artillery adviser with the British Military Mission in South Russia. For gallantry during the Russian Civil War, he was awarded the Albert Medal on 14 July 1920. The citation reads:

On the 14th November, 1919, at Novorossisk, South Russia, an ammunition dump exploded, setting fire to the SS War Pike, which was carrying a cargo of munitions, including shells. Colonel Cotton, as explosions were taking place both on the quay and on board the ship, cleared the bystanders from the neighbourhood, and assisted in castings off the hawsers from the vessel. He then organised a small party to follow the steamer in a tug, when it was towed out to sea, in order to render all possible assistance, and, although the vessel was burning fiercely, the hold and bunkers being well alight, he boarded her and endeavoured to get the fire under control. It was not until the fore part of the ship began to settle down that he and his party left the vessel. Colonel Cotton's prompt action, which was attended by great personal risk, in all probability saved many lives.

Captain Thomas Stratford Knill, the master of the War Pike, was also awarded the Albert Medal for the same incident.

Cotton was appointed Companion of the Order of St Michael and St George (CMG) in 1919 and awarded the French Croix de guerre with Palms and the Belgian Croix de guerre. He was also appointed Officer of the Order of St Maurice and St Lazarus by Italy and was awarded the Order of St Vladimir 3rd Class by Russia. On 15 March 1920, he was appointed Commander of the Order of the British Empire (CBE) for his services in South Russia.

== Post-war ==
On 1 January 1921, Cotton was promoted to the substantive rank of colonel. He served as Colonel-Commandant, Royal Artillery (CCRA) of the 28th Division from 29 September 1922 to 1 October 1923 during the Chanak Crisis, and also temporarily commanded the division. Reverting to colonel once more, he served as Commander, Royal Artillery (CRA) with the Territorial Army's 56th (1st London) Division from 21 October 1924 to 8 January 1926.

He completed his service in India, as CCRA in Southern Command from 14 February 1926 to 30 April 1927, and then as CCRA (later Brigadier, Royal Artillery (BRA) from 1 June 1928) in Northern Command, headquartered at Poona, from 30 April 1927 until 15 April 1930. For this service, he was appointed Companion of the Order of the Bath (CB) in the 1930 Birthday Honours. He retired on 14 June 1930 with the honorary rank of brigadier-general.

After retirement, he lived in Bournemouth, where he served in civil defence during the Second World War. In 1903, he married Rose Bousfield. They had one daughter, Joan Bousfield Cotton.
