= 28th Division (United Kingdom) =

- Formation sign of the 28th Division, a strip of red cloth on the shoulder strap.
- Active: 1914 – 1923
- Country: United Kingdom
- Branch: British Army
- Type: Infantry
- Size: Division
- Engagements: First World War; Western Front; Battle of Gravenstafel; Battle of St Julien; Battle of Frezenberg; Battle of Bellewaarde; Battle of Loos; Balkans Campaign; Battle of Doiran

Commanders
- Notable commanders: Edward Bulfin

The 28th Division was an infantry division of the British Army raised for service in World War I.

== History ==
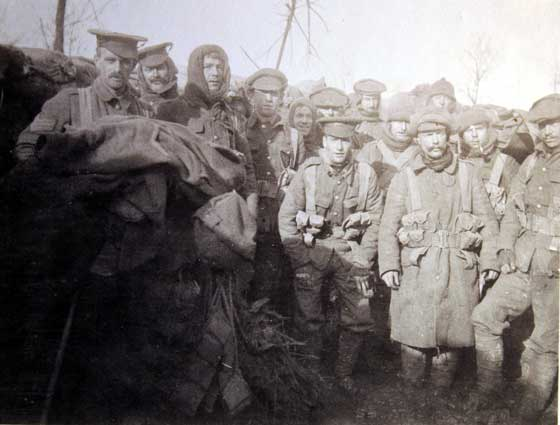
Men of 'B' Company, 2nd Battalion, King's Own Royal Regiment (Lancaster), in the trenches near Zonnebeke, Belgium, April 1915.

Formed in England in December 1914–January 1915 from Regular Army battalions returning from India, Singapore and Egypt. In January 1915 the division, commanded by Edward Bulfin, moved to France and on to the Western Front.

The division took part in the Second Battle of Ypres in April, where they suffered massive casualties, and in the Battle of Loos from September to October.

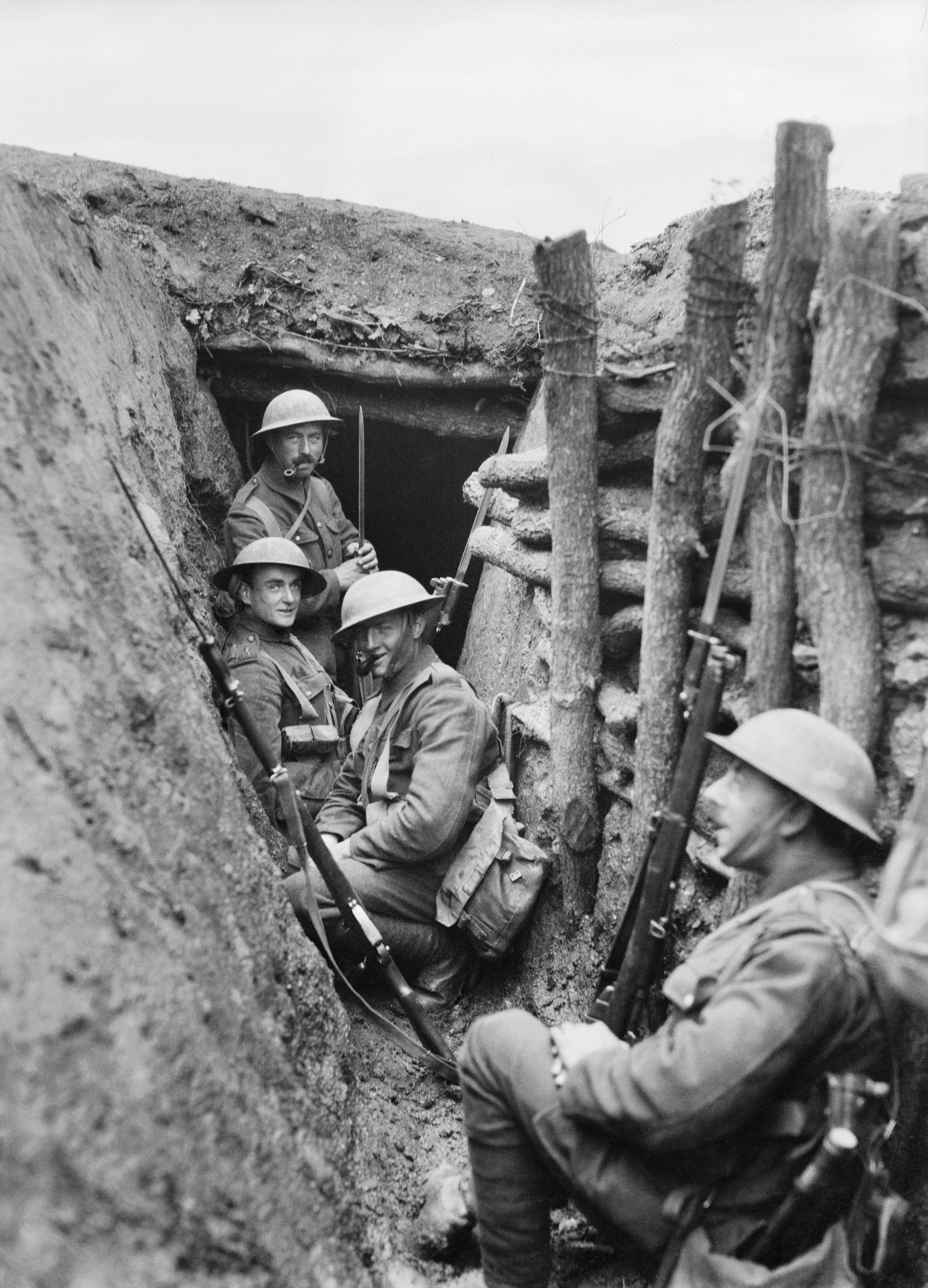
Men of the 3rd Battalion, Royal Fusiliers, manning a trench near Bairakli Jum'a in Macedonia, May 1917.

In October 1915 the 28th Division embarked from Marseille for Egypt and in November 1915 travelled on to the Macedonian front where the division would remain for the rest of the war.

After the Armistice with Bulgaria came into effect on 30 September 1918, the 28th Division advanced across the country towards Turkey. The Ottoman Empire also signed an Armistice on 30 October, after which the 28th Division, under Major General Henry Leycester Croker, was sent to occupy the Dardanelles Forts.

It remained in Turkey on peacekeeping duties until October 1923.

== Order of battle ==
The division was composed of the following units during World War I:

=== 83rd Infantry Brigade ===
This brigade was temporarily under the command of the 5th Division between 3 March and 7 April 1915, when it was replaced by the 15th Infantry Brigade from that division.

- 2nd Battalion, King's Own Royal Regiment (Lancaster)
- 1/5th Battalion, King's Own Royal Regiment (Lancaster) (joined March 1915, left October 1915)
- 2nd Battalion, East Yorkshire Regiment
- 1st Battalion, King's Own Yorkshire Light Infantry (left June 1918)
- 1st Battalion, York and Lancaster Regiment
- 1/3rd Territorial Force, (T.F.) Battalion, Monmouthshire Regiment (joined March 1915, left September 1915. Amalgamated with the 1/1st and 1/2nd Battalions following serious casualties at Ypres between May and August 1915)
- 83rd Machine Gun Company (formed 21 May 1916)
- 83rd Trench Mortar Battery (formed 12 September 1916, as No 4 Trench Mortar Battery)

=== 84th Infantry Brigade ===
This brigade was temporarily under the command of the 5th Division between 23 February and 7 April 1915, when it was replaced by the 13th Infantry Brigade from that division.

- 2nd Battalion, Northumberland Fusiliers (left June 1918)
- 1st Battalion, Suffolk Regiment
- 2nd Battalion, Cheshire Regiment
- 1st Battalion, Welch Regiment
- 1/6th (T.F.) (Glamorgan) Battalion, Welch Regiment (joined July 1915, left October 1915)
- 1/1st Battalion, Monmouthshire Regiment (joined February 1915, left September 1915)
- 1/12th (T.F.) (County of London) Battalion, London Regiment (joined February 1915, left May 1915)
- 84th Machine Gun Company (formed 18 May 1916)
- 84th Trench Mortar Battery (joined 7 November 1916)

=== 85th Infantry Brigade ===
The brigade transferred temporarily to the 3rd Division between 19 February 1915 and 6 April 1915. It was replaced by the 9th Infantry Brigade from that division.

- 2nd Battalion, Buffs (East Kent Regiment)
- 3rd Battalion, Royal Fusiliers (left July 1918)
- 2nd Battalion, East Surrey Regiment
- 3rd Battalion, Middlesex Regiment (left November 1916)
- 1/8th Battalion, Middlesex Regiment (joined March 1915, left June 1915)
- 85th Machine Gun Company (formed 18 May 1916)
- 85th Trench Mortar Battery (formed September 1916, as No 5 Trench Mortar Battery)

=== 228th Infantry Brigade ===
This brigade was formed on 26 February 1917, as army troops, although it was always associated with this division. It came under the command of the Greek "Crete Division" from 30 September 1918, and was broken up on 4 October 1918.

- 2nd (Garrison) Battalion, King's (Liverpool) Regiment (joined August 1917)
- 2/5th (T.F.) Battalion, Durham Light Infantry (joined March 1917)
- 1st Garrison Battalion, Seaforth Highlanders (joined March 1917)
- 2nd Garrison Battalion, Royal Irish Fusiliers (joined March 1917, left August 1917))
- 22nd (Wessex & Welsh) Battalion, Rifle Brigade (joined November 1916)
- 228th Machine Gun Company (formed 11 September 1917, became 277th Company)
- 228th Trench Mortar Company (formed 18 September 1917)
- 228th Signal Section, Royal Engineers (formed 15 March 1917)
- 143rd Field Ambulance, Royal Army Medical Corps (formed 19 March 1917)

=== Division Troops ===
- 23rd (Service) Battalion (Welsh Pioneers), Welsh Regiment (joined August 1916)
- 28th Divisional Train Army Service Corps
  - 120th, 121st, 122nd and 123rd Companies (joined from 13th (Western) Division in November 1915)
- 17th Mobile Veterinary Section Army Veterinary Corps
- 819th Divisional Employment Company (formed 14 September 1917)
- Divisional Mounted Troops
  - B Squadron, 1/1st Surrey Yeomanry (joined 22 December 1914, left to join XVI Corps on 27 December 1916)
  - 28th Cyclist Company Army Cyclist Corps (joined 29 December 1914, left to join XVI Corps on 8 December 1916)

=== Royal Artillery ===
- III Brigade, Royal Field Artillery (R.F.A)
- XXXI Brigade, R.F.A.
- CLXLVI Brigade R.F.A. (left August 1917)
- LIV Brigade, R.F.A. (joined August 1917)
- VIII (Howitzer Brigade R.F.A. (attached from 5th Division between 21 February and 23 June 1915)
- 71st and 121st Heavy Batteries, Royal Garrison Artillery (R.G.A.) (joined 18 January 1915, left 6 April 1915)
- 61st Howitzer Battery, R.F.A. (attached between 21 February and June 1915)
- CXXX (Howitzer) Brigade, R.F.A. (joined September 1915)
- 13 Heavy Battery, R.G.A. (joined 23 October 1915 from 13th (Western) Division, left 26 February 1916, for XXXVII Heavy Brigade)
- 7th Mountain Battery, R.G.A. (attached between 30 December 1915 and 18 June 1916)
- IV Highland (Mountain) Brigade, R.G.A. (joined December 1916, left 10 September 1918)
- III Mountain Brigade, R.G.A. (joined 16 September 1918)
- 28th Divisional Ammunition Column (formed by Territorials from the Wessex (Hampshire) Heavy Battery, Royal Garrison Artillery)

=== Royal Engineers ===
- 3rd London Field Company, R.E. (joined 26 December 1914, left to rejoin 47th (2nd London) Division on 6 April 1915)
- 1/1st Northumbrian Field Company, R.E. (joined 26 December 1914, left to rejoin 50th (Northumbrian) Division on 2 June 1915)
- 1/1st North Midland Field Company, R.E. (joined 26 December 1914, left to rejoin 46th (North Midland) Division on 6 April 1915)
- 38th Field Company, Royal Engineers (joined from 6th Division 8 April 1915)
- 2/1st Northumbrian Field Company, R.E. (joined 10 July 1915, later renumbered 449th (Northumbrian) Field Company)
- 1/7th Hampshire Field Company, R.E. (joined 25 October 1915 later renumbered 506th (Hampshire) Field Company)
- 1st Home Counties Divisional Signals Company, R.E. (joined 1 January 1915)

=== Royal Army Medical Corps ===
- 84th (1/2nd London) Field Ambulance
- 85th (1/3rd London) Field Ambulance
- 86th (2nd Northumbrian) Field Ambulance
- 15th (London) Sanitary Section

== Commanders ==
- Major-General E. S. Bulfin (17 December 1914) Sick
- Major-General C. J. Briggs (12 October 1915)

- Acting: Brigadier-General H. S. L. Ravenshaw (18 May 1916)

- Major-General H L. Croker (21 May 1916)

- Acting: Brigadier-General E. M. Morris (27 January 1917)

- Major-General H. L. Croker (8 March 1917)
- Major-General T. O. Marden (8 November 1920)
- Colonel-Commandant A. S. Cotton (19 March 1923)

== See also ==
- List of British divisions in World War I
