= Bryan Mahon =

Irish soldier and politician (1862–1930)

General The Right Honourable Sir Bryan Mahon KCB KCVO DSO FRGS
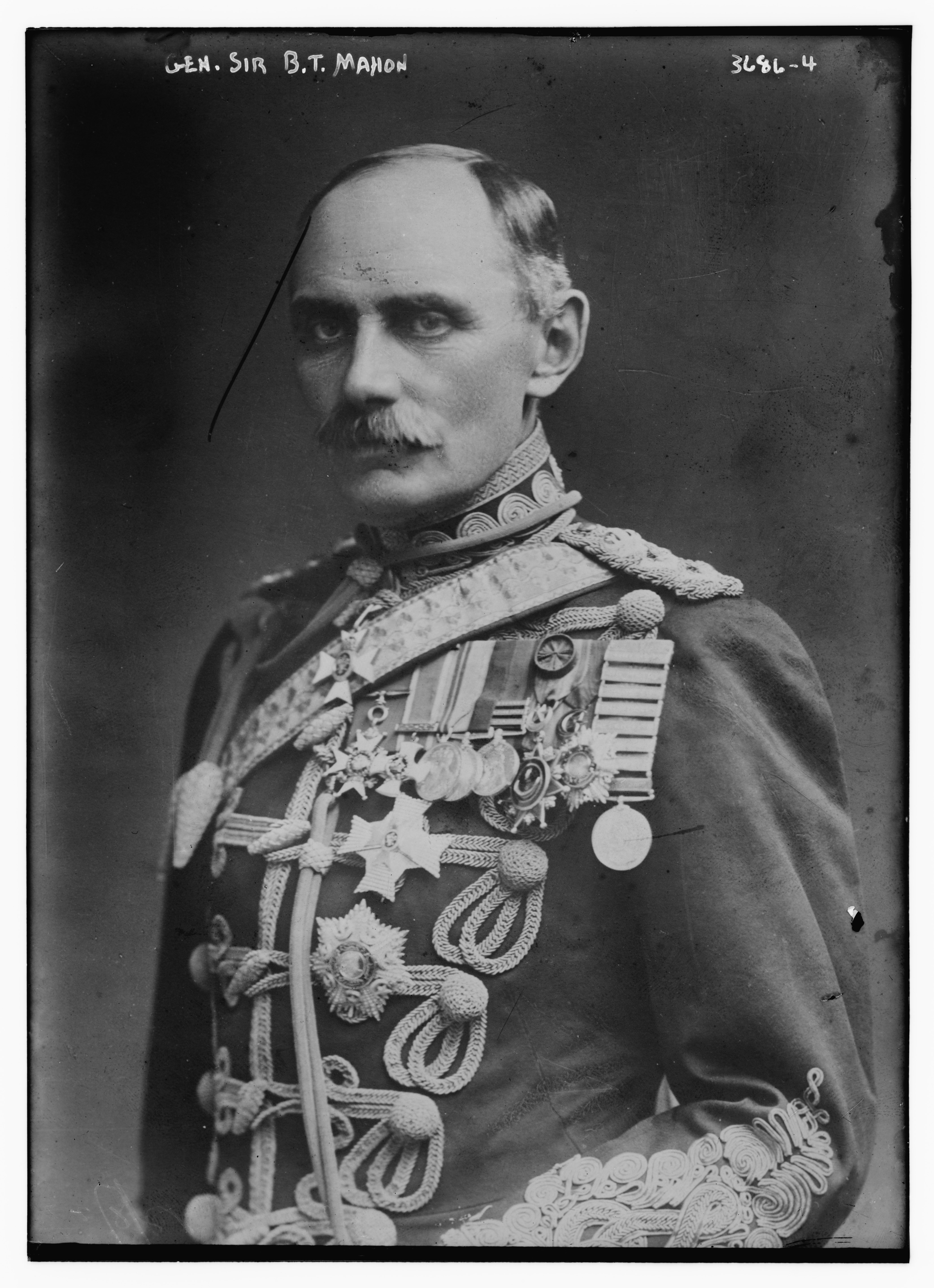
- Mahon in 1910
- Born: 2 April 1862; County Galway, Ireland
- Died: 29 September 1930 (aged 68); Dublin, Ireland
- Military career
- Allegiance: United Kingdom
- Branch: British Army
- Service years: 1883–1921
- Rank: General
- Unit: 8th (King's Royal Irish) Hussars
- Commands: 2nd (Sialkot) Cavalry Brigade; 10th (Irish) Division; British Salonika Army; Western Frontier Force; Commander-in-Chief, Ireland
- Conflicts: Mahdist War: Battle of Ferkeh; Second Boer War: Siege of Mafeking; World War I: Gallipoli campaign; Macedonian front; Senussi campaign
- Awards: Knight Commander of the Order of the Bath; Distinguished Service Order; Knight Commander of the Royal Victorian Order; Mentioned in Despatches

Senator
- In office 11 December 1922 – 29 September 1930

Personal details
- Party: Independent
- Spouse: Amelia Milbanke (m. 1920)

Sir Bryan Thomas Mahon, KCB, KCVO, DSO, PC (Ire), FRGS (2 April 1862 – 29 September 1930) was an Irish general of the British Army, a senator of the short-lived Senate of Southern Ireland and a member for eight years of the Irish Free State Senate until his death.

== Early life and military career ==
Bryan Thomas Mahon was born at Belleville, County Galway, on 2 April 1862. After having served in the Galway Militia, into which he had been commissioned as a second lieutenant in April 1879, he transferred to the 21st Hussars in January 1883, before finally transferring to the 8th (King's Royal Irish) Hussars in February 1883. He was promoted to captain in April 1888.

After being seconded for service with the Egyptian Army in January 1893, he served in Sudan in the Dongola Expedition in 1896 as a staff officer to Major General Sir Herbert Kitchener, and was present at the Battle of Ferkeh and the operations at Hafir. He was promoted to major in October 1897.

In 1899, he took part in the final defeat of the Khalifa as Assistant Adjutant general in charge of Intelligence, and was mentioned in despatches (dated 25 November 1899) by Colonel Wingate with the following words:

I cannot speak in sufficiently strong terms of the excellence of the services performed by this officer. I invariably placed him in general command of all the mounted troops; his personal disregard for danger, intrepid scouting, and careful handling of men, all fit him for high command; his bold and successful seizure of the position in front of Fedil's camp, and his conduct of the fight before I came up, show him to possessed of exceptional qualities as a commander.

In recognition of his service in the Sudan, he received a brevet promotion to colonel on 14 March 1900, and a substantive promotion to lieutenant colonel after transferring to the 12th Lancers (later the 12th Royal Lancers).

During the Second Boer War Colonel Mahon led a flying column, 2,000 strong, consisting mainly of South African volunteers from Kimberley, which came to the Relief of Mafeking. The town, which had been under siege for seven months by Boer forces, was facing starvation. Mahon was appointed a Companion of the Order of the Bath (CB) for his services during the operations, and was invested with the order by King Edward VII on 2 June 1902 after his return to the United Kingdom.

Mahon was appointed a Fellow of the Royal Geographical Society in May 1902, and was briefly governor of Khartoum in 1903. In April 1904, after serving on half-pay, he took command of a second class district in India, for which he was promoted to substantive colonel and re-promoted to temporary brigadier general while holding the appointment. In December 1906 he was, at the age of 44, promoted to major general while commanding a brigade in India. He was promoted to command a division in August 1909. He became colonel of his regiment, the 8th Hussars, in April 1910.

He was promoted to lieutenant general in September 1912, one of the youngest of his rank in the army.

== First World War ==
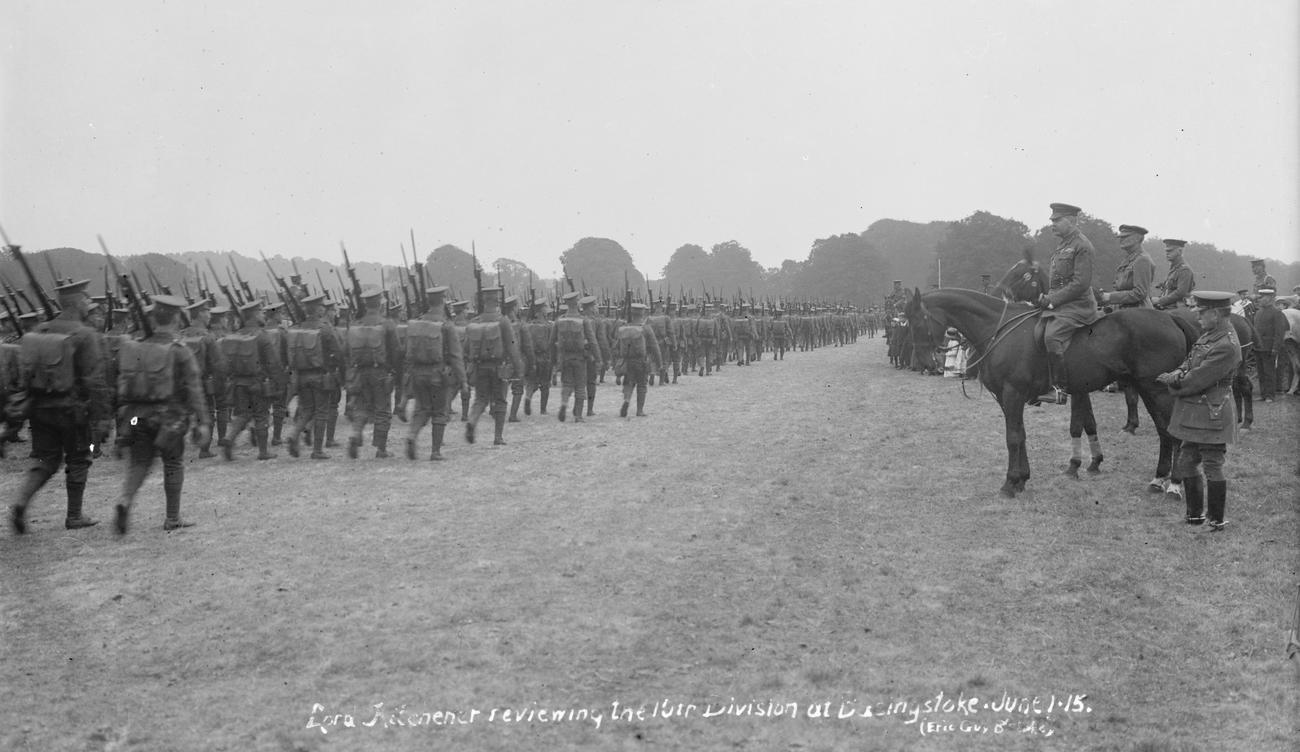
Lord Kitchener, on the right on horseback, reviewing the 10th (Irish) Division at Basingstoke, Hampshire, June 1915. Sat behind him is Lieutenant General Mahon, the division's GOC.

During the First World War, which began in the summer of 1914, he commanded the 2nd (Sialkot) Cavalry Brigade and in October was assigned to be the first general officer commanding (GOC) of the 10th (Irish) Division, a Kitchener's Army formation composed of civilian volunteers for the army. Despite being "both a protestant and a unionist", it was hoped "that his public image would boost recruitment".

Mahon led his division during the Gallipoli campaign and, "like the majority of generals in this affair, did not emerge with his reputation intact". The 10th Division landed at Suvla Bay on the night of 6–7 August 1915. Although Mahon's division was "potentially the best of those sent to Suvla", it was split up by General Sir Ian Hamilton, commander of the Mediterranean Expeditionary Force, and thus "deprived Mahon of the chance to show what he could do". Furthermore, Hamilton chose to select Beauvoir De Lisle as the new commander of IX Corps, believing Mahon was not up to the task. Mahon, who "loathed" De Lisle, refused to serve under him and resigned his command.

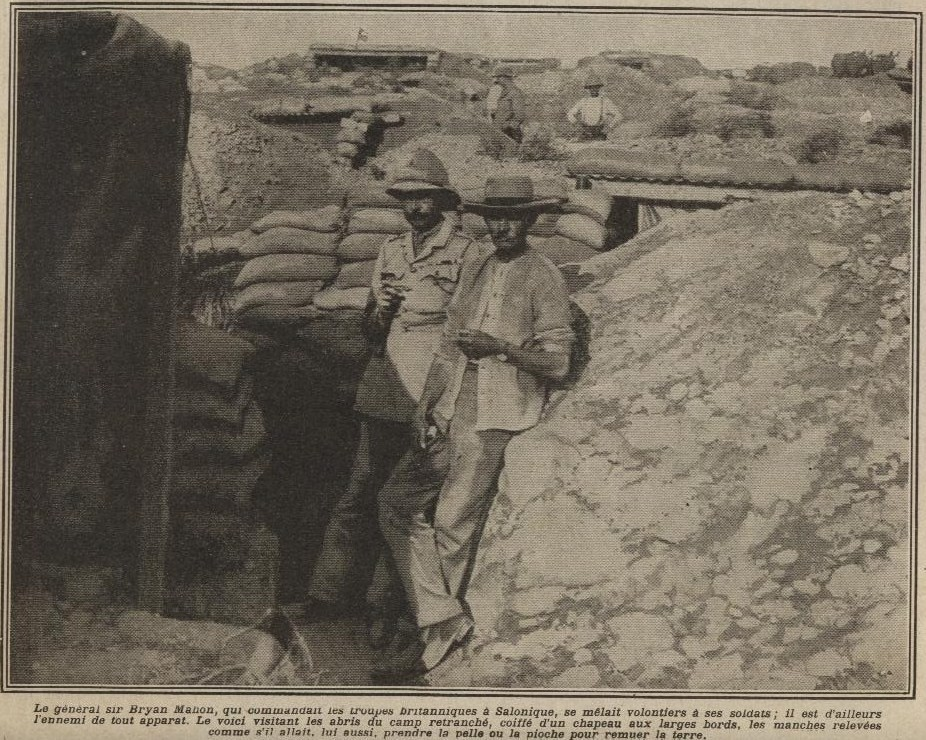
Mahon at Salonika, 1916.

In September he moved with the division to be head of the British Salonika Army to support Serbia at the onset of the Macedonian campaign. In 1916, after relinquishing command of the Army to Lieutenant-General George Milne, Mahon took up command of the Western Frontier Force in the Egyptian Expeditionary Force.

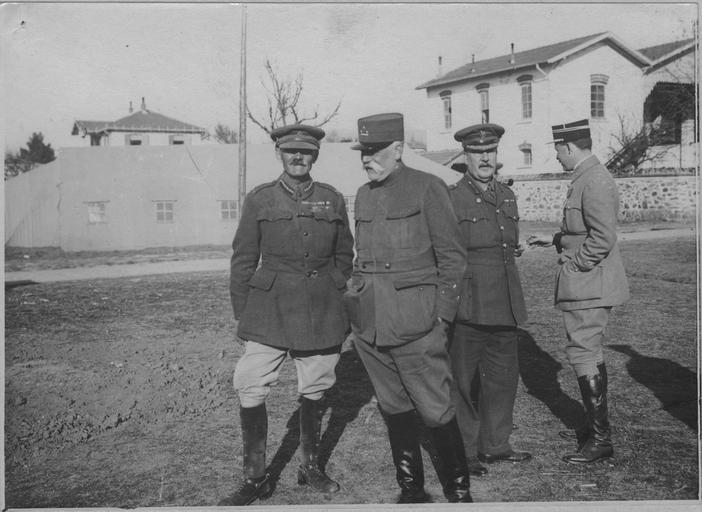
Lieutenant-General Mahon and French General Maurice Sarrail, along with other senior officers, at Salonika, March 1916.

He was then appointed as the Commander-in-Chief, Ireland, in November 1916 in the lead up to the Irish War of Independence.

== Postwar and final years ==
He retired from the British Army at the end of August 1921, after having been promoted to the rank of full general the month before.

After his retirement he was elected as a privy council member of the short-lived Senate of Southern Ireland. He was appointed to Seanad Éireann by the President of the Executive Council, W. T. Cosgrave, in 1922 and 1925.

His home, Mullaboden in Ballymore-Eustace, County Kildare, was burned down by the IRA in February 1923 during the Irish Civil War. The most valuable furniture had been removed to Dublin after the destruction of Palmerstown, the residence of Lord Mayo, another Kildare member of the Irish Senate, the previous month. A gramophone and typewriter were stolen and one of Mahon's tunics was taken and worn by one of the republicans for a photo taken of the squad that carried out the arson.

He and his wife, Lady Mahon, formerly Lady Amelia Milbanke, widow of Sir John Milbanke, V.C., were not home at the time. In 1923, "malicious injury claims" by the Mahons were filed with Kildare County Council in the amount of more than £60,000; they were awarded £21,341.

Mahon was elected to the Seanad in 1928, and served until his death at the relatively young age of 68 in September 1930.

Military offices
| New post | GOC 10th (Irish) Division; 1914–1915 | Succeeded by John Longley |
| Preceded by Charles C. Monro | Commander of the British Salonika Army; 1915–1916 | Succeeded by George Milne |
| Preceded by John Maxwell | Commander-in-Chief, Ireland; 1916–1918 | Succeeded by Frederick Shaw |
