= George Milne, 1st Baron Milne =

Senior British Army officer

Field Marshal The Right Honourable The Lord Milne GCB GCMG DSO KStJ
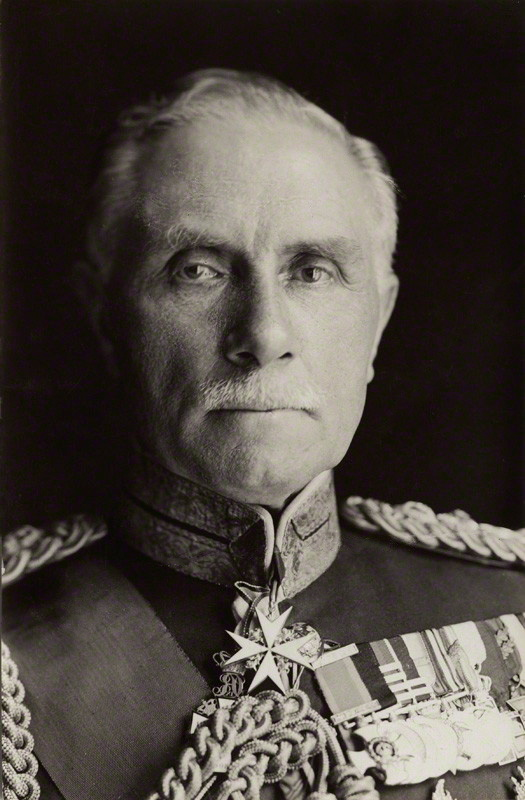
- Field Marshal Lord Milne by Olive Edis (1920)
- Born: 5 November 1866; Aberdeen, Scotland
- Died: 23 March 1948 (aged 81); London, England
- Military career
- Allegiance: United Kingdom
- Branch: British Army
- Service years: 1885–1933
- Rank: Field Marshal
- Nickname: "Uncle George"
- Unit: Royal Artillery
- Commands: Chief of the Imperial General Staff; Eastern Command; Salonika Army; XVI Corps; 27th Division
- Conflicts: Mahdist War; Second Boer War; First World War; Turkish War of Independence
- Awards: Knight Grand Cross of the Order of the Bath; Knight Grand Cross of the Order of St Michael and St George; Companion of the Distinguished Service Order; Mentioned in Despatches; Grand Cross of the Order of the White Eagle (Serbia); Grand Officer of the Order of Saints Maurice and Lazarus (Italy); Grand Cross of the Order of the Redeemer (Greece); War Cross (Greece); Grand Cross of the Legion of Honour (France)
- Other work: Constable of the Tower of London (1933–1938)

Field Marshal George Francis Milne, 1st Baron Milne, GCB, GCMG, DSO, KStJ (5 November 1866 – 23 March 1948) was a senior British Army officer who served as Chief of the Imperial General Staff (CIGS) from 1926 to 1933. He served in the Second Boer War and during the First World War he served briefly on the Western Front but spent most of the war commanding the British forces on the Macedonian front. As CIGS he generally promoted the mechanisation of British land forces although limited practical progress was made during his term in office.

== Military career ==
Born in Aberdeen on 5 November 1866, the son of George Milne and Williamina Milne (née Panton), and educated at MacMillan's School in Aberdeen and the Royal Military Academy, Woolwich, which he entered in March 1884, George Francis Milne was commissioned into the Royal Artillery on 16 September 1885. He was initially posted to a battery at Trimulgherry in India and then joined a battery at Aldershot in 1889 before being posted back to India to a battery at Meerut in 1891.

Promoted to captain on 4 July 1895, he joined the Royal Garrison Artillery in Malta. Next he was appointed battery captain at Hilsea and then attended the Staff College, Camberley in 1897. There he became a friend of his classmate William Robertson. He took part in the Nile Expedition in 1898, seeing action at Omdurman and scoring a direct hit on the Mahdi's tomb with his battery.

He served in the Second Boer War in South Africa, where he was appointed deputy assistant adjutant general (DAAG) on 18 February 1900, and was promoted to major on 1 November 1900. He was mentioned in despatches on 2 April 1901, and appointed a Companion of the Distinguished Service Order (DSO) in the South Africa Honours list published on 26 June 1902.

Following the end of the war in June 1902, Milne received the brevet rank of lieutenant colonel on 22 August 1902 (the honour was gazetted in the October 1902 South Africa honours list), and returned to the United Kingdom on the SS Orotava which arrived at Southampton in early September.

He took over from Lieutenant Colonel George Forestier-Walker the post of deputy assistant quartermaster general (DAQMG) in the intelligence division at headquarters on 26 January 1903 and then, having been promoted to brevet colonel on 1 November 1905, and from supernumerary major to major in January 1907, he was seconded for service on the staff and became a general staff officer, grade 2 (GSO2) at the headquarters (HQ) of the North Midland Division (a Territorial Force (TF) formation) in April 1908, the day on which the TF was officially created. He was promoted to colonel, "after nearly twenty-five years military service", in November 1909 and took over the position of general staff officer, grade 1 (GSO1) of the 6th Division in Cork from Colonel William Douglas.

Having been appointed a Companion of the Order of the Bath (CB) in the King's Birthday Honours of June 1912, he was, at the relatively young age of 46, promoted to temporary brigadier general and became commander, Royal Artillery (CRA) of the 4th Division at Woolwich, then part of Kent, on 1 October 1913, taking over from Colonel Edmund Phipps-Hornby.

== First World War ==
=== France and Belgium ===
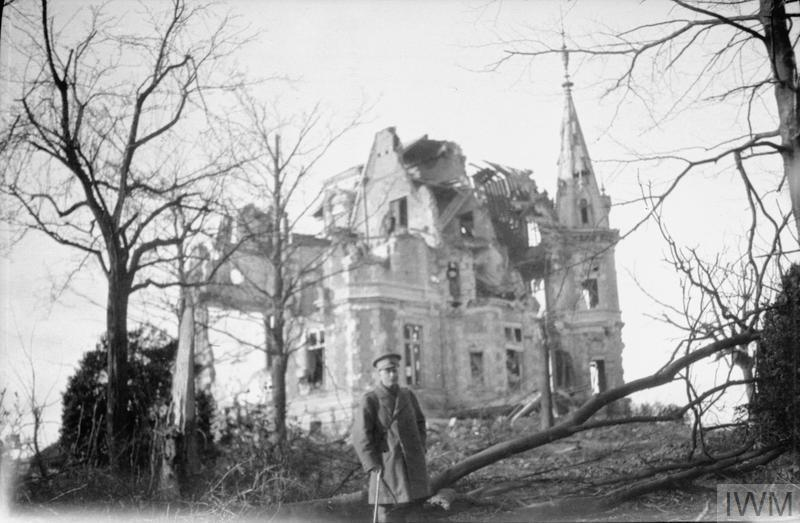
Brigadier General Milne, BGRA 4th Division, at Chateau Rossignol on Hill 63 opposite Messines, Belgium, November 1914. The chateau was used as an observation post by men of the 4th Division Artillery.

At the outbreak of the First World War in late July 1914, Milne was commanding the divisional artillery of the 4th Division which formed part of the British Expeditionary Force and was sent to France in August. He commanded the 4th Division's artillery at Le Cateau on 27 August and later on the Marne from 6–9 September and at the First Battle of the Aisne, from 13–20 September, and lastly at the First Battle of Ypres, fought from 3 October until 25 November.

He became brigadier general, general staff (BGGS) of III Corps in January 1915 and was promoted to the rank of major general on 18 February, "in connection with Operations in the Field." Five days later, he succeeded Brigadier General George Forestier-Walker, a fellow artilleryman, as major general, general staff (MGGS) of the Second Army, a post he retained until July. He was later mentioned in despatches for his service during the Second Battle of Ypres in April that year.

He was then appointed general officer commanding of the 27th Division in July, in succession to Major General Thomas Snow, who had also commanded the 4th Division several months earlier.

=== Salonika ===
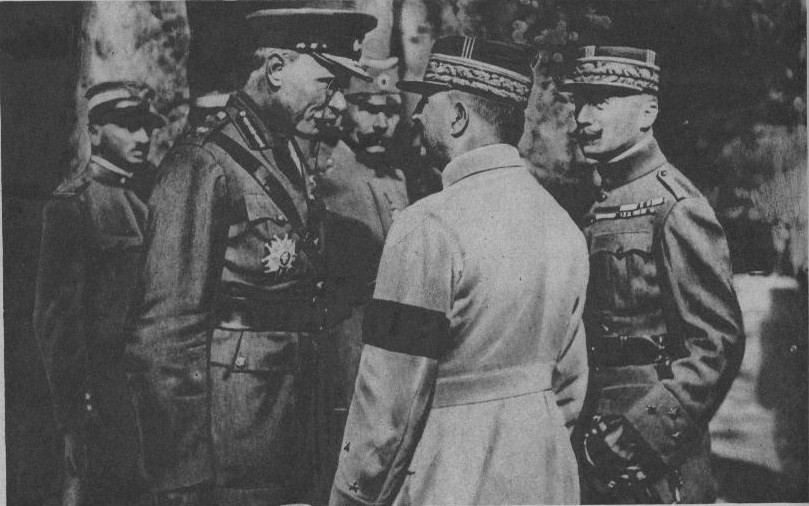
Milne (left) with General Franchet d'Espèrey (centre) and General Paul Henrys (right)

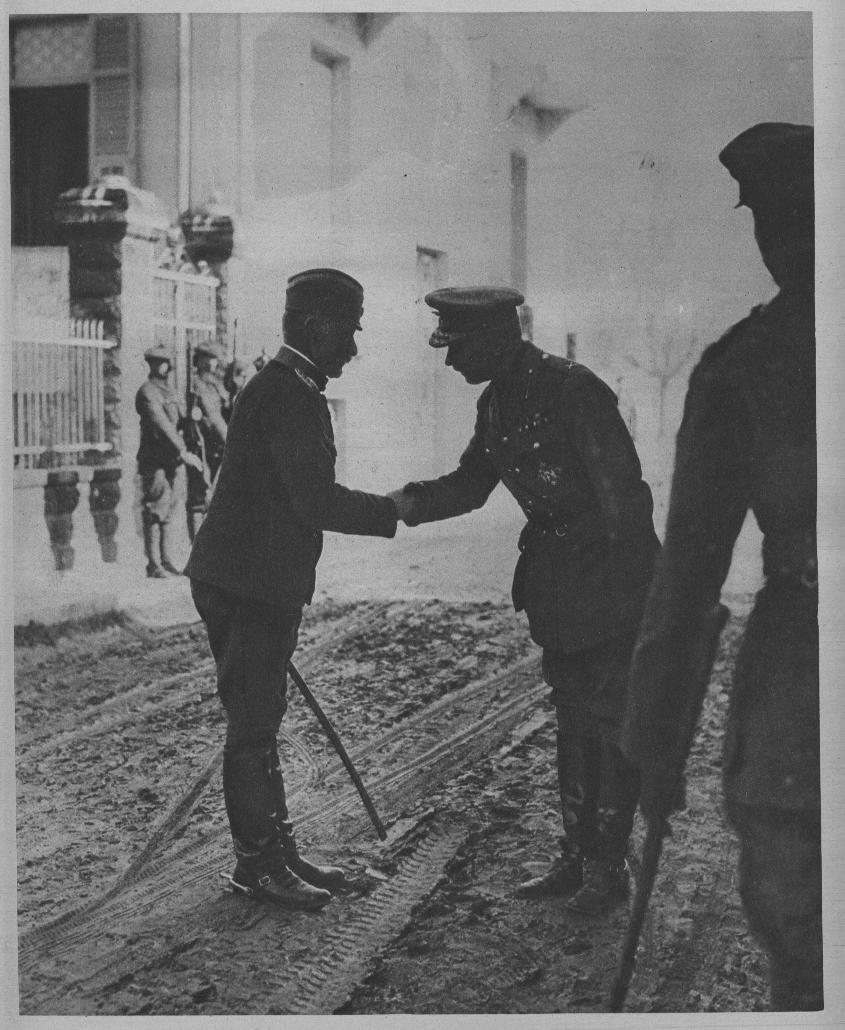
Lieutenant General Milne (right) shaking hands with Field Marshal Živojin Mišić (left)

Salonika front 1917

Milne, promoted to temporary lieutenant-general in December 1915, was appointed to command the newly formed XVI Corps in Salonika in January 1916 with orders to oppose Bulgarian advances on the Macedonian front.

When he succeeded Lieutenant General Sir Bryan Mahon as commander-in-chief (C-in-C) of the British Salonika Army, Milne became overall C-in-C of British Troops in Macedonia on 9 May 1916. As late as 3 June 1916 Milne was ordered by General Sir William Robertson, now Chief of the Imperial General Staff (CIGS) but formerly a classmate at the Staff College almost twenty years earlier, not to participate in any attack on the Bulgars. He was awarded the Grand Cross of the Order of the White Eagle (1st Class, with Swords) by the King of Serbia on 1 July 1916.

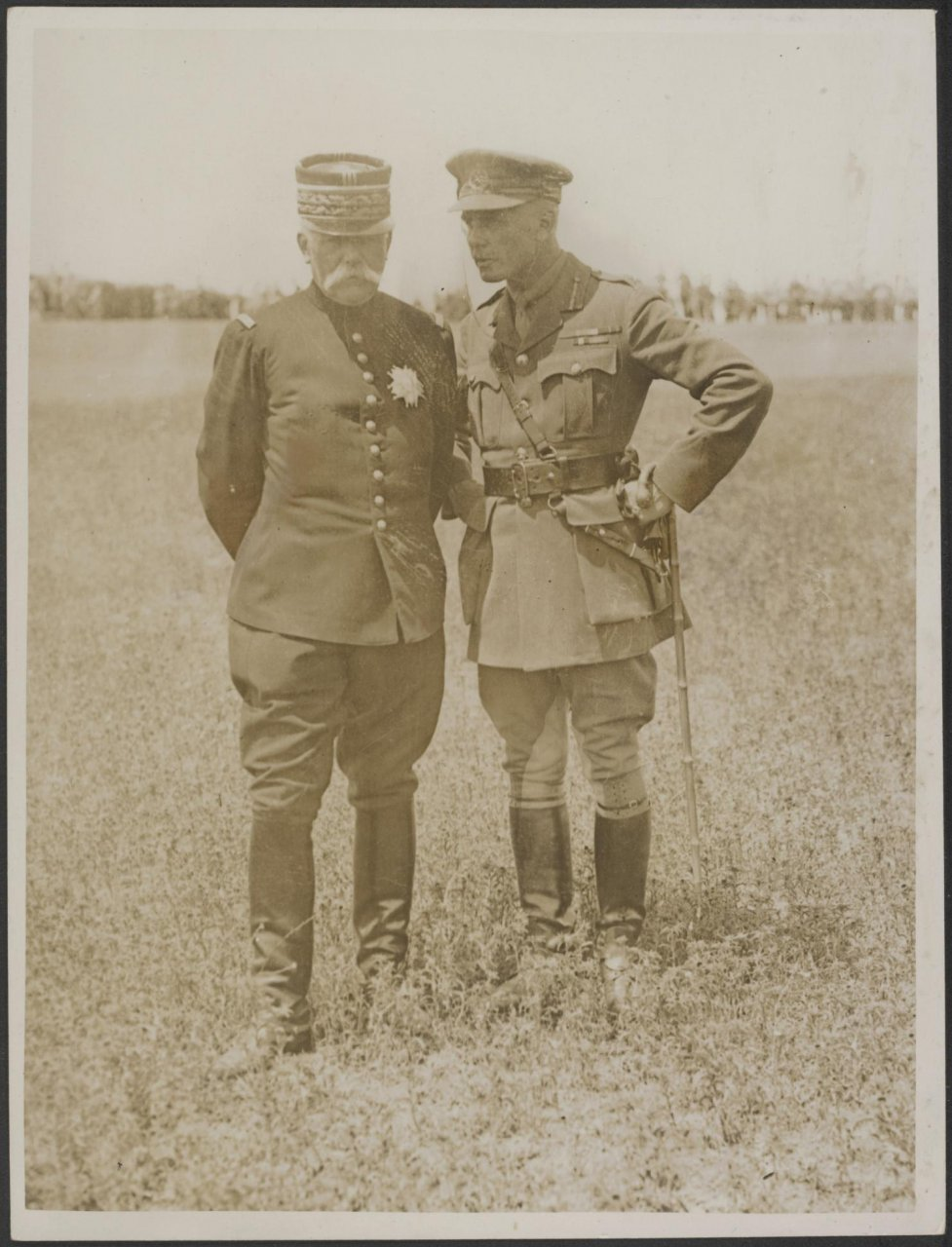
Lieutenant General Sir George Milne, the newly appointed commander of the British forces at Salonika, in conversation with General Maurice Sarrail, commanding the Allied forces at Salonika, May 1916.

The British Government accepted the need to maintain a presence in Salonika to keep the French happy, but Robertson, who often communicated by secret letters and "R" telegrams to generals in the field, privately told Milne that he did not favour offensive operations. Milne broadly agreed with Robertson that any attempt to attack across the mountains to cut the Nis-Sofia-Constantinople railway was logistically impractical, although he did stress that his forces must either advance or retreat from the malaria-infested Struma Valley and that the Bulgarians might be beaten if pressed hard. On 23 July he was told to "engag(e) the maximum of Bulgar forces" whilst the Romanians mobilised and attacked, followed by secret messages from Robertson that he should "guard against being committed for any serious action" until it was certain that Romania was coming in. With Bulgaria seeming close to collapse in October and November 1916, Milne advised Robertson (5 November) that the Germans would do all they could to keep her in the war.

The 60th (2/2nd London) Division was sent from France as reinforcements to Salonika in December. Milne was promoted to permanent lieutenant general on 1 January 1917. On 3 January 1917 Milne arrived at the Rome Conference independently of the French General Maurice Sarrail. The official French record of the Rome Conference did not even mention Milne as a participant. As a result of the conference Milne was placed under Sarrail's command, with right of appeal to his own government – who overruled him when he protested against Sarrail's movement of a British brigade outside the British zone. This precedent was much discussed in the next few months when Prime Minister David Lloyd George attempted to place the BEF on the Western Front under General Robert Nivelle.

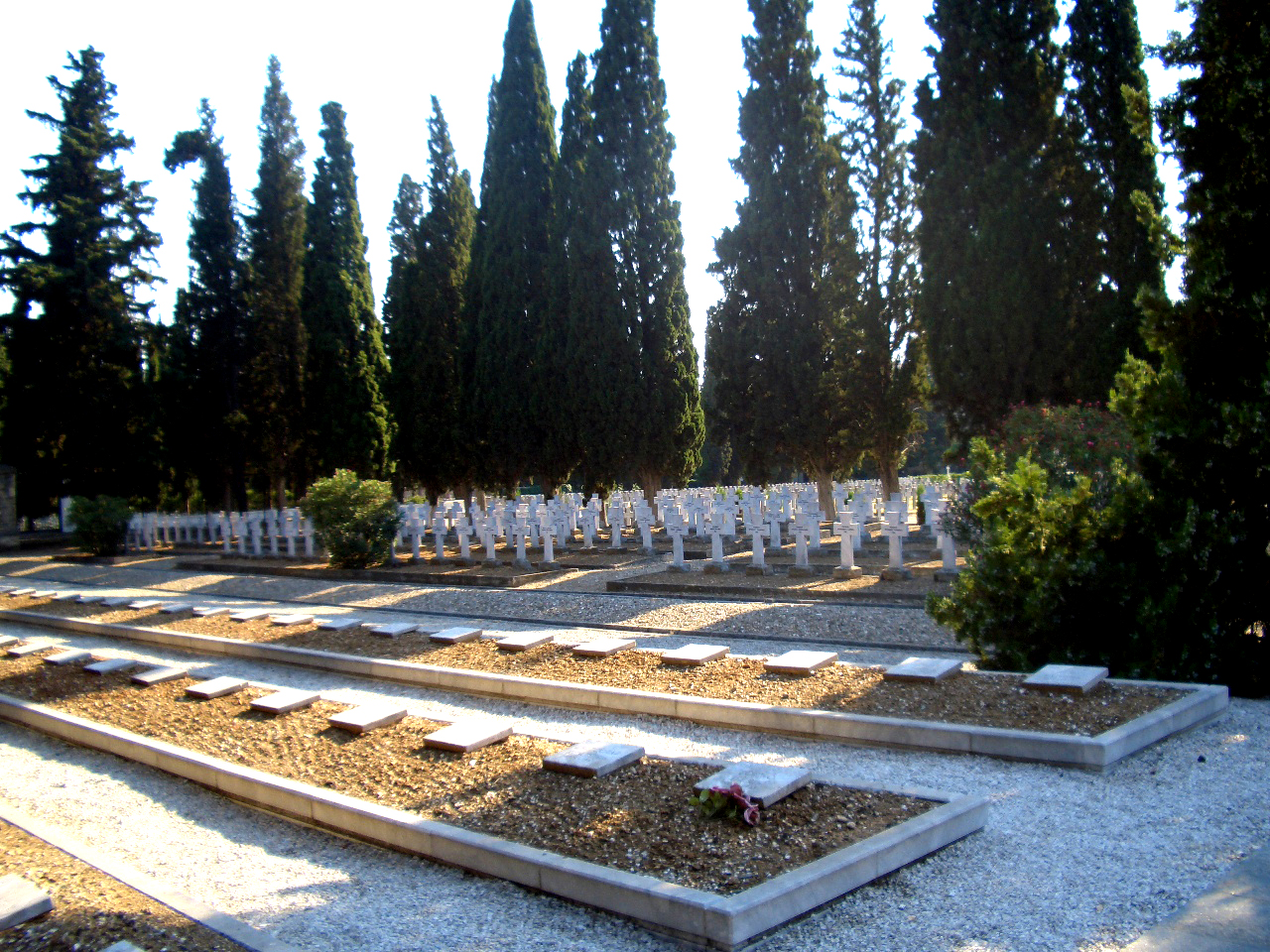
An Allied cemetery at Thessaloniki (Salonika).

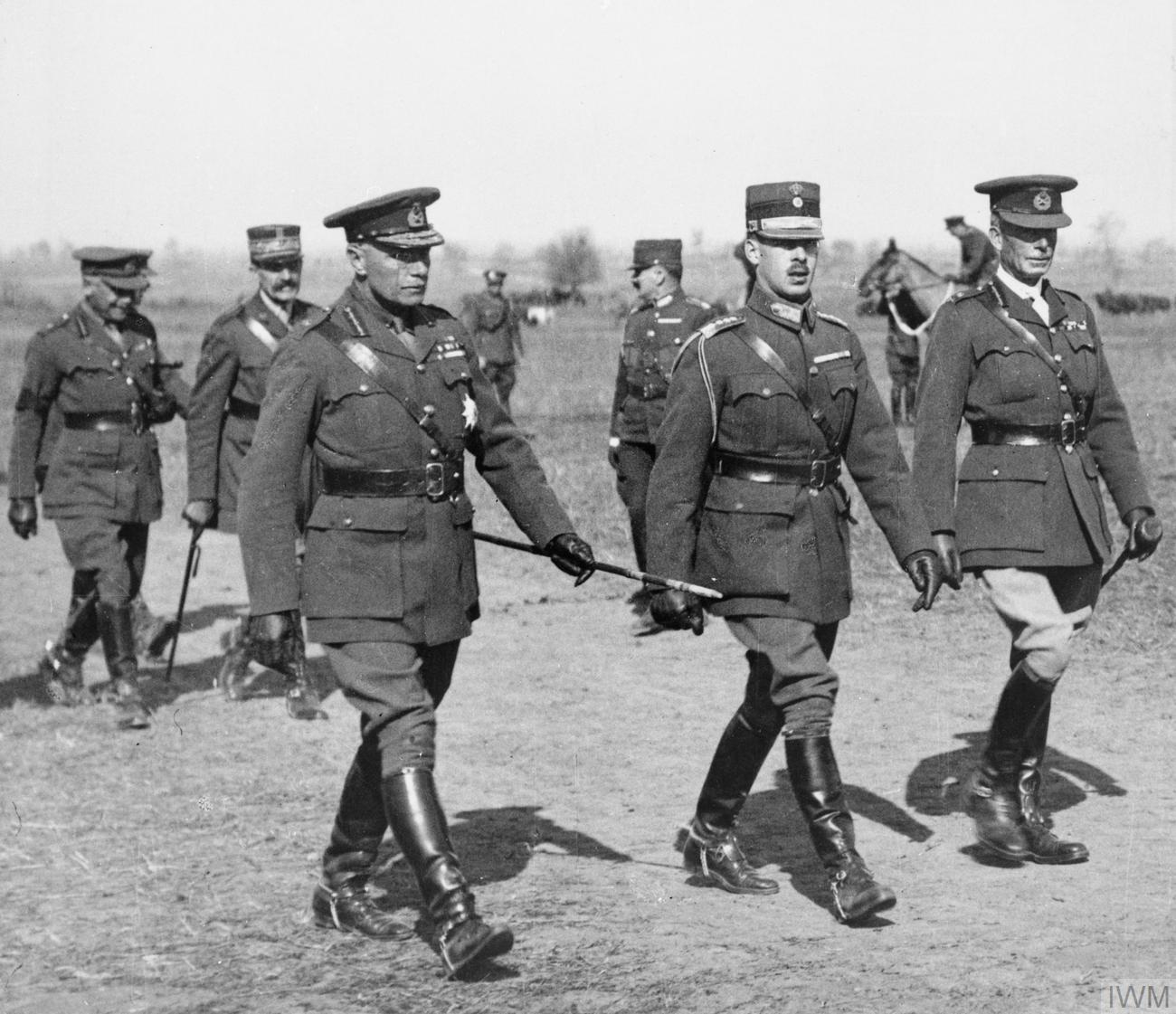
From left to right: Lieutenant General George Milne (commander of the British Salonika Force) with King Alexander I of Greece and Lieutenant General Charles Briggs, GOC XVI Corps of the BSF, 1917.

Milne undertook numerous offensives in support of his French and Serbian allies with limited resources. His attack at Lake Doiran in spring 1917 cost 5,000 dead and seriously wounded, one quarter of all British casualties throughout the entire Salonika campaign. Another British attack in the Struma Valley was more successful. His troops were constantly suffering from malaria. Milne was appointed a Grand Officer of the Order of Saints Maurice and Lazarus by the King of Italy on 31 August 1917 and advanced to Knight Commander of the Order of the Bath on 1 January 1918.

Although Milne, promoted to the temporary rank of general in June, was repulsed again at Lake Doiran in September, French and Serbian units were successful in defeating the Bulgarian Army at the Battle of Dobro Pole which took place that same month. Bulgaria then signed an armistice.

== Post-war ==
In September 1918, Milne became responsible for the military administration of a vast area around the Black Sea at a time of considerable internal disorder following the Russian Revolution and the start of the Turkish War of Independence. Small British forces had twice occupied Baku on the Caspian, while an entire British division had occupied Batum on the Black Sea, supervising German and Turkish withdrawal. British (including Indian and some Arab) troops were in Persia (partly to protect the oilfields at Abadan) and larger British forces were also deployed in Mesopotamia and Syria.

Milne toured the Caucasus in early 1919 and thought "the country and the inhabitants are equally loathsome" and that British withdrawal "would probably lead to anarchy" but "the world would (not) lose much if the whole of the country cut each other’s throats. They are certainly not worth the life of a single British soldier". At the end of August 1919 the British withdrew from Baku (the small British naval presence was also withdrawn from the Caspian Sea), leaving only 3 battalions at Batum. Lord Curzon, Foreign Secretary, wanted a British presence in the region, although to Curzon's fury (he thought it "abuse of authority") the CIGS, General Sir Henry Wilson (who had succeeded "Wully" Robertson in early 1918) gave Milne permission to withdraw if he deemed it necessary. After a British garrison at Enzeli (on the Persian Caspian coast) was taken prisoner by Bolshevik forces on 19 May 1920, Lloyd George finally insisted on a withdrawal from Batum early in June 1920. Financial retrenchment forced a British withdrawal from Persia in the spring of 1921.

Milne was appointed Grand Cross (First Class) of the Order of the Redeemer by the King of the Hellenes in October 1918, appointed a Knight Commander of the Order of St Michael and St George on 1 January 1919, advanced to Knight Grand Cross of the Order of St Michael and St George on 3 June 1919 and given the Greek Military Cross in July 1919. He was also awarded the Grand Cross of the French Legion of Honour in August 1919 and made a Knight of Grace of the Venerable Order of Saint John on 9 April 1920. In March 1920 he occupied Constantinople and took over the administration of the city, which was collapsing.

== Later career and life ==
Promoted to substantive general on 26 April 1920, he was appointed lieutenant of the Tower of London on 15 December 1920 and General Officer Commanding Eastern Command on 1 June 1923. Having been made aide-de-camp general to the King on 31 July 1923, he became CIGS on 19 February 1926. In that role he supported the publication of the study Mechanised and Armoured Formations (issued in 1929) and generally promoted the mechanisation of British land forces although limited practical progress was made during his term in office. Having been advanced to Knight Grand Cross of the Order of the Bath in the New Year Honours 1927, he was promoted to field marshal on 30 January 1928 before retiring in 1933. On 26 January 1933 he was raised to the peerage as Baron Milne, of Salonika and of Rubislaw in the County of Aberdeen.

He was also a colonel commandant of the Royal Artillery from 21 November 1918, honorary colonel of the Hampshire Heavy Brigade, RA, from 24 April 1926, until 20 June 1931, Master Gunner, St James's Park from 1929, Constable of The Tower of London from 1933 and Colonel Commandant of the Pioneer Corps from 1940.

During the Second World War, which began in September 1939, he was an Air Raid Warden in Westminster. He also wrote a weekly column for the Sunday Chronicle. He died in London on 23 March 1948, at the age of 81.

== Marriage and children ==
In 1905, he married Claire Maitland, daughter of Sir John Nisbet Maitland, 5th Baronet; they had a son and a daughter.

== Arms ==
Coat of arms of George Milne, 1st Baron Milne
Crest A dexter hand holding up an open book Proper, leaved Or. Escutcheon Or, a cross moline pierced lozengeways of the field between four mullets Azure. Supporters Dexter, an officer of the Royal Horse Artillery; sinister, an officer of the Greek Evzone Guard, both in full dress uniform. Motto Efficiunt Clarum Studia (Studies Make Illustrious)

== Bibliography ==
- Heathcote, Tony (1999). The British Field Marshals 1736–1997. Barnsley (UK): Pen & Sword. ISBN 0-85052-696-5.
- Jeffery, Keith (2006). Field Marshal Sir Henry Wilson: A Political Soldier. Oxford University Press. ISBN 978-0-19-820358-2.
- Nicol, Graham (1976). Uncle George: Field-Marshal Lord Milne of Salonika and Rubislaw. Reedminster. ISBN 978-0859450041.
- Palmer, Alan (1998). Victory 1918. Weidenfeld & Nicolson. ISBN 0-297-84124-6.
- Woodward, David R (1998). Field Marshal Sir William Robertson. Westport Connecticut & London: Praeger. ISBN 0-275-95422-6.

Military offices
Preceded by Thomas Snow	GOC 27th Division; 1915–1916	Succeeded by William Marshall
New title	GOC XVI Corps; January – May 1916	Succeeded by Charles Briggs
Preceded by Bryan Mahon	GOC British Salonika Army; 1916–1918	Succeeded by Henry Wilson
Preceded by Lord Horne	GOC-in-C Eastern Command; 1923–1926	Succeeded by Sir Walter Braithwaite
Preceded by The Earl of Cavan	Chief of the Imperial General Staff; 1926–1933	Succeeded by Sir Archibald Montgomery-Massingberd
Honorary titles
Preceded by Lord Horne	Master Gunner, St. James's Park; 1929–1946	Succeeded by Viscount Alanbrooke
Preceded by Lord Methuen	Constable of the Tower of London; 1933–1938	Succeeded by Sir Claud William Jacob
Peerage of the United Kingdom
New title	Baron Milne; 1933–1948	Succeeded by George Douglass Milne
