= 27th Division (United Kingdom) =

- Formation sign of the 27th Division, a strip of yellow cloth on the shoulder strap.
- Active: October 1914 – 1919
- Country: United Kingdom
- Branch: British Army
- Type: Infantry
- Engagements: World War I

The 27th Division was an infantry division of the British Army raised during the Great War.

== History ==
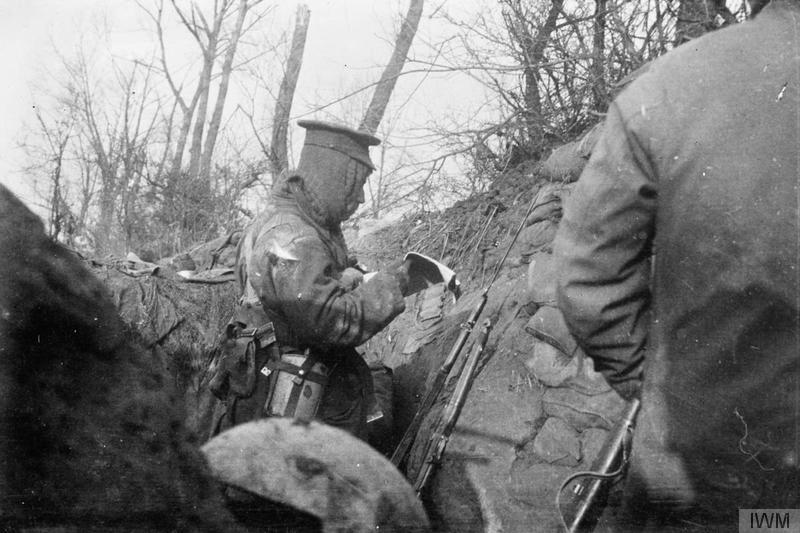
Men of the 1st Battalion, Royal Scots, in the front line at Kemmel, January 1915.

The 27th Division was formed in late 1914 by combining various Regular Army units that had been acting as garrisons about the British Empire.

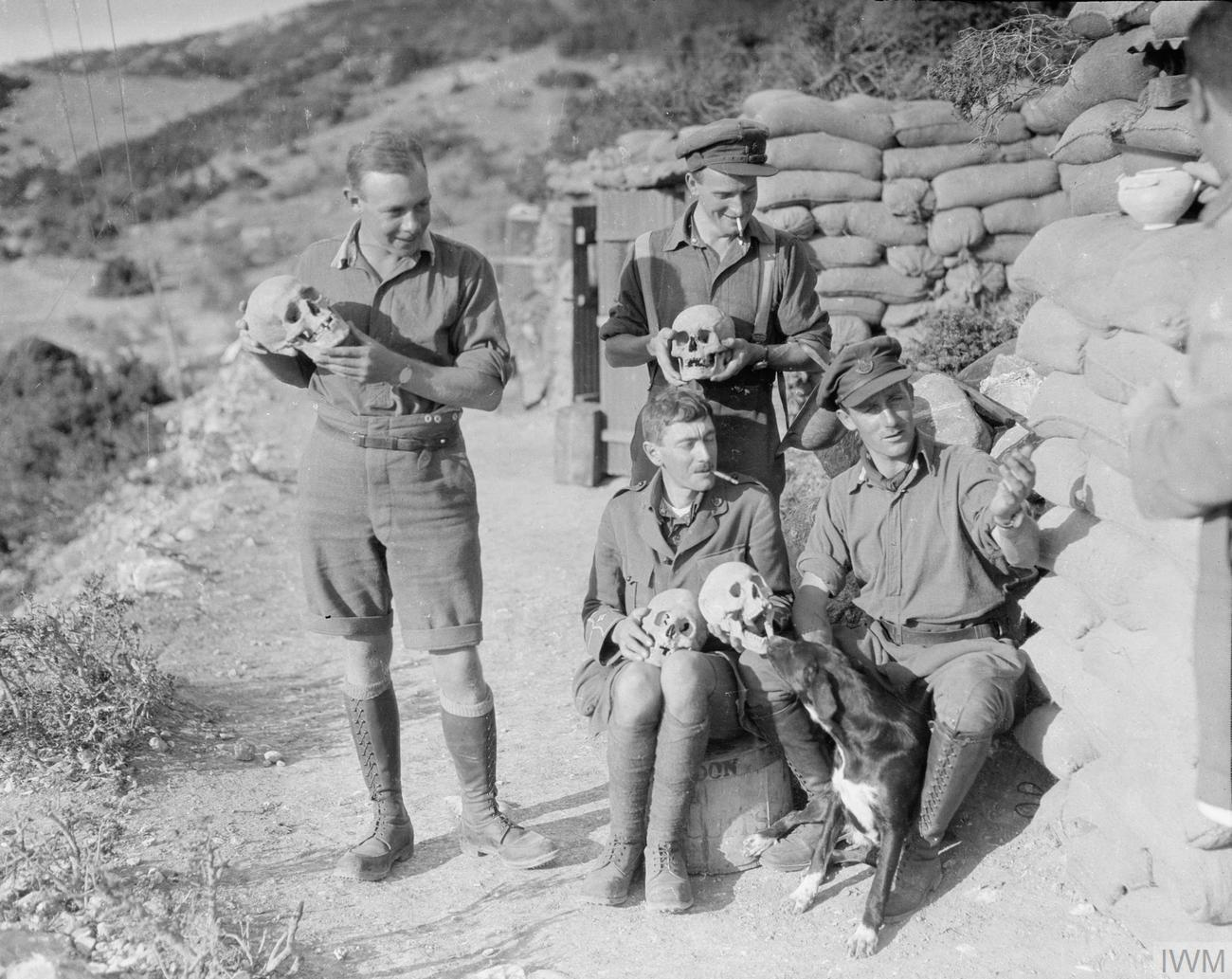
Officers of the 2nd Battalion, King's Shropshire Light Infantry, with skulls excavated during the construction of trenches and dugouts at the ancient Greek site of Amphipolis, 1916.

The division spent most of 1915 on the Western Front in France before moving to the Macedonian front, where it remained with the British Salonika Army for the duration of the war. In 1916 its commander, Major General Hurdis Ravenshaw, was captured by an Austrian submarine whilst sailing to England. In 1918 in Salonika the division took part in the Battle of Doiran.

It carried out occupation duties in the Caucasus in the post-war before being withdrawn from the region in 1919.

== Order of battle ==
The division was composed of the following units:

80th Infantry Brigade

- 2nd Battalion, King's Shropshire Light Infantry
- 3rd Battalion, King's Royal Rifle Corps
- 4th Battalion, King's Royal Rifle Corps (left June 1918)
- 4th Battalion, Rifle Brigade (The Prince Consort's Own)
- Princess Patricia's Canadian Light Infantry (left November 1915, joining the 3rd Canadian Division)
- 80th Machine Gun Company, Machine Gun Corps (joined 16 May 1916)
- 80th Trench Mortar Battery (joined 2 September 1916)
- 80th SAA Section Ammunition Column (joined 28 September 1916)

81st Infantry Brigade

- 1st Battalion, Royal Scots
- 2nd Battalion, Queen's Own Cameron Highlanders (left November 1916)
- 1st Battalion, Argyll and Sutherland Highlanders
- 2nd Battalion, Gloucestershire Regiment (to the 82nd Infantry Brigade November 1916)
- 13th (Scottish Horse Yeomanry) Battalion, Black Watch (Royal Highland Regiment) (from October 1916)
- 81st Machine Gun Company, Machine Gun Corps (joined 16 May 1916)
- 81st Trench Mortar Battery (joined 2 October 1916)

The following battalions also served with the brigade a time in 1915:

- 1/9th (Highlanders) Battalion, Royal Scots (February to November)
- 1/9th (The Dumbartonshire) Battalion, Argyll and Sutherland Highlanders (February to May)

82nd Infantry Brigade

- 2nd Battalion, Duke of Cornwall's Light Infantry
- 1st Battalion, Royal Irish Regiment (left November 1916)
- 2nd Battalion, Royal Irish Fusiliers (left November 1916)
- 1st Battalion, Prince of Wales's Leinster Regiment (left November 1916)
- 2nd Battalion, Gloucestershire Regiment (joined from 81st Brigade. November 1916)
- 10th (Service) Battalion, Hampshire Regiment (joined November 1916)
- 82nd Machine Gun Company, Machine Gun Corps (joined 16 May 1916)
- 82nd Trench Mortar Battery (joined 2 October 1916)

The following battalions also served with the brigade a time in 1915:

- 1/1st (T.F.) Battalion, Cambridgeshire Regiment (February to November)
- 10th (Lovat Scouts) (T.F.) Battalion, Queen's Own Cameron Highlanders (October to June)

19th Infantry Brigade

The brigade joined the division in May 1915 from the 6th Division leaving for the 2nd Division in August.

- 2nd Battalion, Royal Welch Fusiliers
- 1st Battalion, Cameronians (Scottish Rifles)
- 1/5th Battalion, Cameronians (Scottish Rifles)
- 1st Battalion, Middlesex Regiment
- 2nd Battalion, Argyll and Sutherland Highlanders

Divisional Troops

- 26th (Service) Battalion, Middlesex Regiment, pioneers (joined August 1916)
- 27th Divisional Train A.S.C.
  - 95th, 96th, 97th and 98th Companies A.S.C. (left November 1915 for 55th Division)
  - 483rd, 484th, 485th and 486th Companies (joined 16 January 1916)
- 16th Mobile Veterinary Section A.V.C.
- 818th Divisional Employment Company (formed 14 September 1917)
- Divisional Mounted Troops
  - A Squadron Surrey Yeomanry (left 27 December 1916)
  - D Squadron Derbyshire Yeomanry (joined 26 March 1916, left June 1916)
  - 27th Divisional Cyclist Company Army Cyclist Corps (left 7 December 1917)

Royal Artillery

- I Brigade, R.F.A
- XIX Brigade, R.F.A.
- XX Brigade, R.F.A.
- CXXIX Brigade (Howitzer), R.F.A.
- IV Home Counties (Howitzer) Brigade (T.F.) ( formed into the 27th Divisional Ammunition Column in December 1914)
- Attached units
  - 130th Howitzer Battery, R.F.A. (from 8 January to 21 February 1915)
  - 61st Howitzer Battery, R.F.A. (from 21 February to June 1915)
  - 2nd Mountain Battery R.G.A. (from 17 to 24 July 1916)
  - Bute Mountain Battery from IV Highland (Mountain) Brigade R.G.A. ( from 22 July to 8 September and 23 to 25 September 1918)

Royal Engineers

- 1/1st Wessex Field Company, (T.F.), Royal Engineers (R.E.) – (joined from the Wessex Division, on 20 November 1914)
- 1/2nd Wessex Field Company, (T.F.) R.E. – (joined from the Wessex Division on 20 November 1914)
- 1/1st South Midland Field Company, (T.F.) R.E. – (joined from the South Midland Division, on 4 December 1914; left 17 March 1915)
- 17th Field Company, R.E. – (transferred from 5th Division on 24 March 1915)
- 1st Wessex Divisional Signal Company, (T.F.) R.E. – (joined from the Wessex Division on 20 November 1914)

Royal Army Medical Corps

- 81st (1st Home Counties) Field Ambulance (T.F.) R.A.M.C.
- 82nd (2nd Home Counties) Field Ambulance (T.F.) R.A.M.C.
- 83rd (3rd Home Counties) Field Ambulance (T.F.) R.A.M.C.
- 7th Sanitary Section R.A.M.C. (joined 9 January 1915 left 16 April 1917)

== Commanders ==
During its existence, 27th Division had the following commanders:

- 19 November 1914 Major-General T.D'O. Snow
- 16 July 1915 Major-General G.F. Milne
- 13 January 1916 Brig.-General S.W. Hare (acting)
- 7 February 1916 Major-General W.R. Marshall
- 14 September 1916 Brig.-General H.D. White-Thomson (acting)
- 15 September 1916 Major-General H.S.L. Ravenshaw
- 30 November 1916 Brig.-General G.A. Weir (acting)
- 22 December 1916 Major-General G.T. Forestier-Walker (invalided, 9 March 1919)
- 10 March 1919 Major-General W.M. Thomson (temporary)
- 10 May 1919 Major-General G.N. Cory

== See also ==
- List of British divisions in World War I

== Bibliography ==
- Becke, Archibald F. (1935). Order of Battle of Divisions Part 1–The Regular British Divisions. London: HMSO. OCLC 4405016.
- Chappell, Mike (1986). British Battle Insignia (1). 1914-18. Oxford: Osprey Publishing. ISBN 9780850457278.
