= New Zealand Machine Gun Corps =

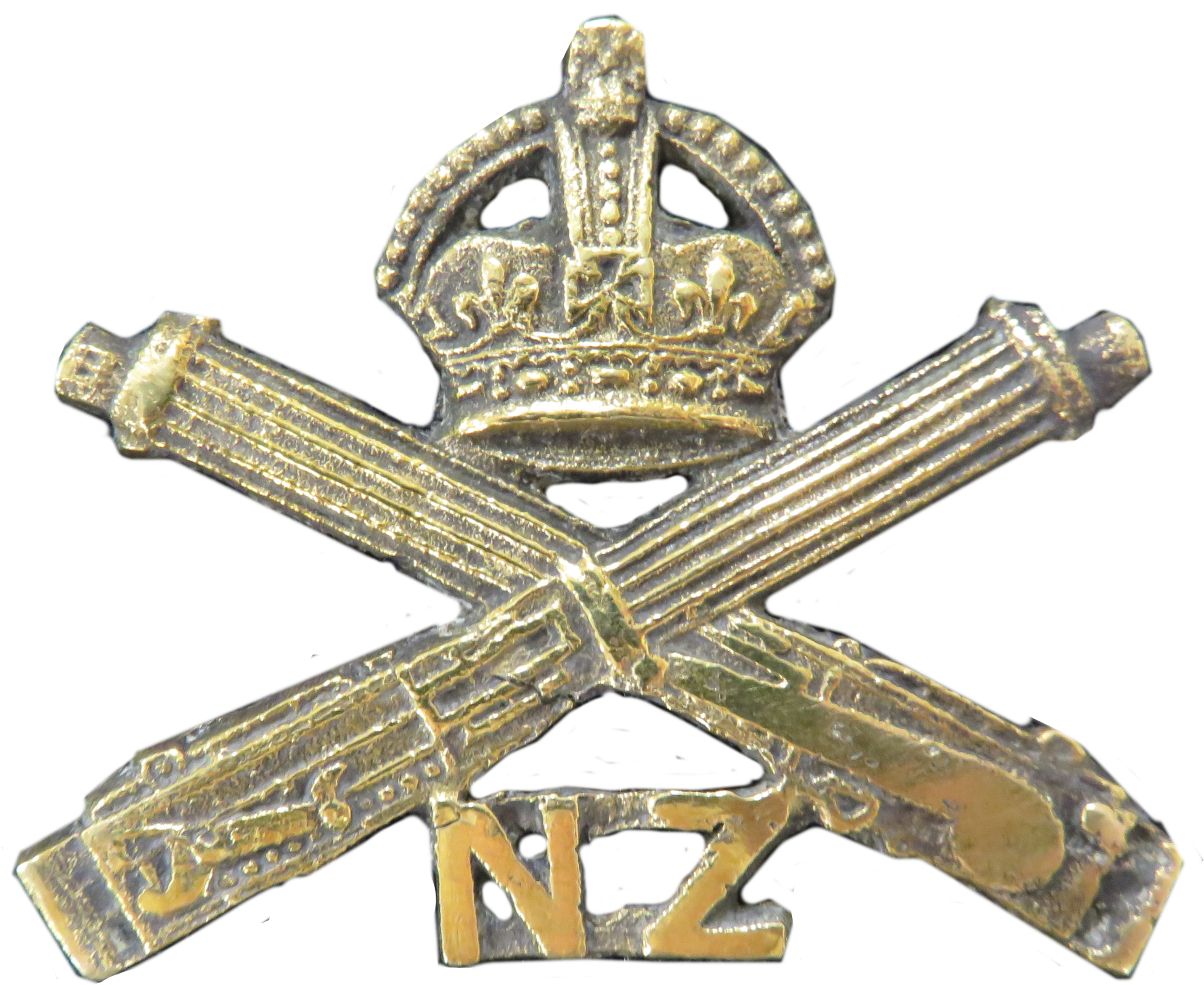
- Cap Badge of the New Zealand Machine Gun Corps
- Active: 1916-1919
- Country: New Zealand
- Allegiance: British Empire
- Role: Machine Gunners
- Size: 5 Companies; 2 Squadrons
- Part of: New Zealand Expeditionary Force
- Engagements: First World War: Western Front; Sinai and Palestine campaign

The New Zealand Machine Gun Corps was an administrative corps of the New Zealand Military Forces during the First World War. It was formed in early 1916, following the Gallipoli campaign in response to a need for more effective machine gun support. The corps initially comprised independent machine gun companies and a mounted machine gun squadron, although in 1918 the machine gun companies were brought together into a machine gun battalion. The New Zealand Machine Gun Corps was disbanded at the end of the war.

== History ==
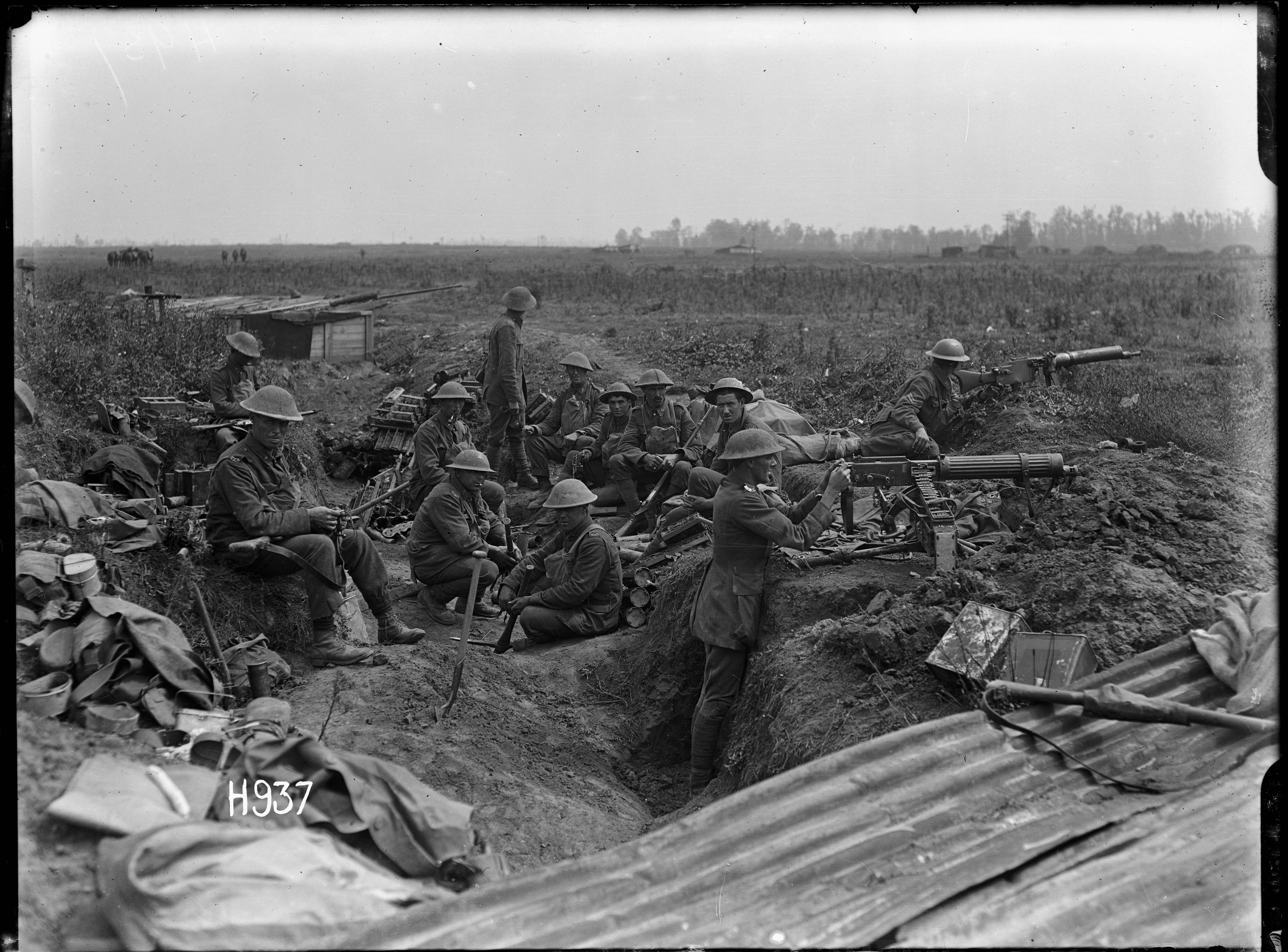
New Zealand machine gunners in France, August 1918

At the beginning of the First World War, each infantry battalion and mounted rifles regiment contained a single section equipped with two Maxim machine guns. The piecemeal distribution of guns and a lack of specialist training was detrimental to the effective utilization of machine gun fire. After the evacuation from Gallipoli, the New Zealand Expeditionary Force was reorganised. As part of the reorganisation the New Zealand Machine Gun Corps was formed. The infantry machine gun sections were detached from their battalions in March 1916 and formed into larger independent companies. Each company was equipped with sixteen Vickers machine guns, which were lighter and more reliable than the old Maxim guns, and each company was assigned to an infantry brigade. In July the machine gun sections of the mounted rifle regiments were also detached and formed into a machine gun squadron to support the New Zealand Mounted Rifles Brigade. The machine gun squadron utilized pack horses to carry their machine guns and were more mobile than the machine gun companies which supported the infantry brigades.

Initially three machine gun companies served with the New Zealand Division on the Western Front. Following the Battle of the Somme in 1916, the decision was made to form a divisional level machine gun company, which joined the New Zealand Division in February 1917. Another machine gun company was also formed in May 1917 to support the new 4th Infantry Brigade. The 4th Infantry Brigade and its associated machine gun company were disbanded in early 1918 due to manpower shortages and the remaining four machine gun companies were grouped together into a battalion in February 1918. The machine gun companies were also redesignated at this point with the 1st, 2nd, 3rd and 5th companies becoming the Auckland, Canterbury, Otago and Wellington companies respectively. Immediately following the end of the war the machine gun battalion took up occupation duties with the rest of the New Zealand Division in Cologne and was disbanded in early 1919.

The 1st Machine Gun Squadron served with the New Zealand Mounted Rifles Brigade in Sinai and Palestine as part of the Desert Mounted Corps. In June 1918 the Imperial Camel Corps Brigade was disbanded and the New Zealand cameliers of the 15th and 16th companies were converted into the 2nd Machine Gun Squadron. The 2nd Machine Gun Squadron served with the newly formed 5th Light Horse Brigade, which had been formed from former Australian cameliers and an attached French mounted regiment. At the end of the war the New Zealand mounted units moved to Egypt and helped to suppress the Egyptian Revolt. Both Machine gun squadrons were disbanded in March 1919.

== List of units ==
Name	Insignia	Assigned to	Formation Date	Disbandment Date	Notes
Headquarters New Zealand Machine Gun Battalion		n/a	February 1918	March 1919	
1st Machine Gun Company		1st Infantry Brigade	March 1916	March 1919	Redesignated as Auckland Company in March 1918
2nd Machine Gun Company		2nd Infantry Brigade	March 1916	March 1919	Redesignated as Canterbury Company in March 1918
3rd Machine Gun Company		3rd (Rifle) Brigade	March 1916	March 1919	Redesignated as Otago Company in March 1918
4th Machine Gun Company		4th Infantry Brigade	May 1917	February 1918	
5th Machine Gun Company		New Zealand Division	February 1917	March 1919	Redesignated as Wellington Company in March 1918
1st Machine Gun Squadron		New Zealand Mounted Rifles Brigade	June 1916	March 1919	
2nd Machine Gun Squadron	None (Note: The 2nd Machine Gun Squadron is not known to have had a unit specific insignia. A colour patch was authorized for a hypothetical 5th Australian machine gun squadron, to be assigned to the 5th Light Horse Brigade, but no such unit was formed and there is no evidence that it was worn by the 2nd New Zealand Machine Gun Squadron.)	5th Light Horse Brigade	June 1918	March 1919	Formed from the 15th and 16th companies of the 4th Battalion, Imperial Camel Corps

== See also ==
- Machine Gun Corps
- Australian Machine Gun Corps
- Canadian Machine Gun Corps
- 27th Machine-Gun Battalion

== Notes ==
References
