= 1st Machine Gun Squadron (New Zealand) =

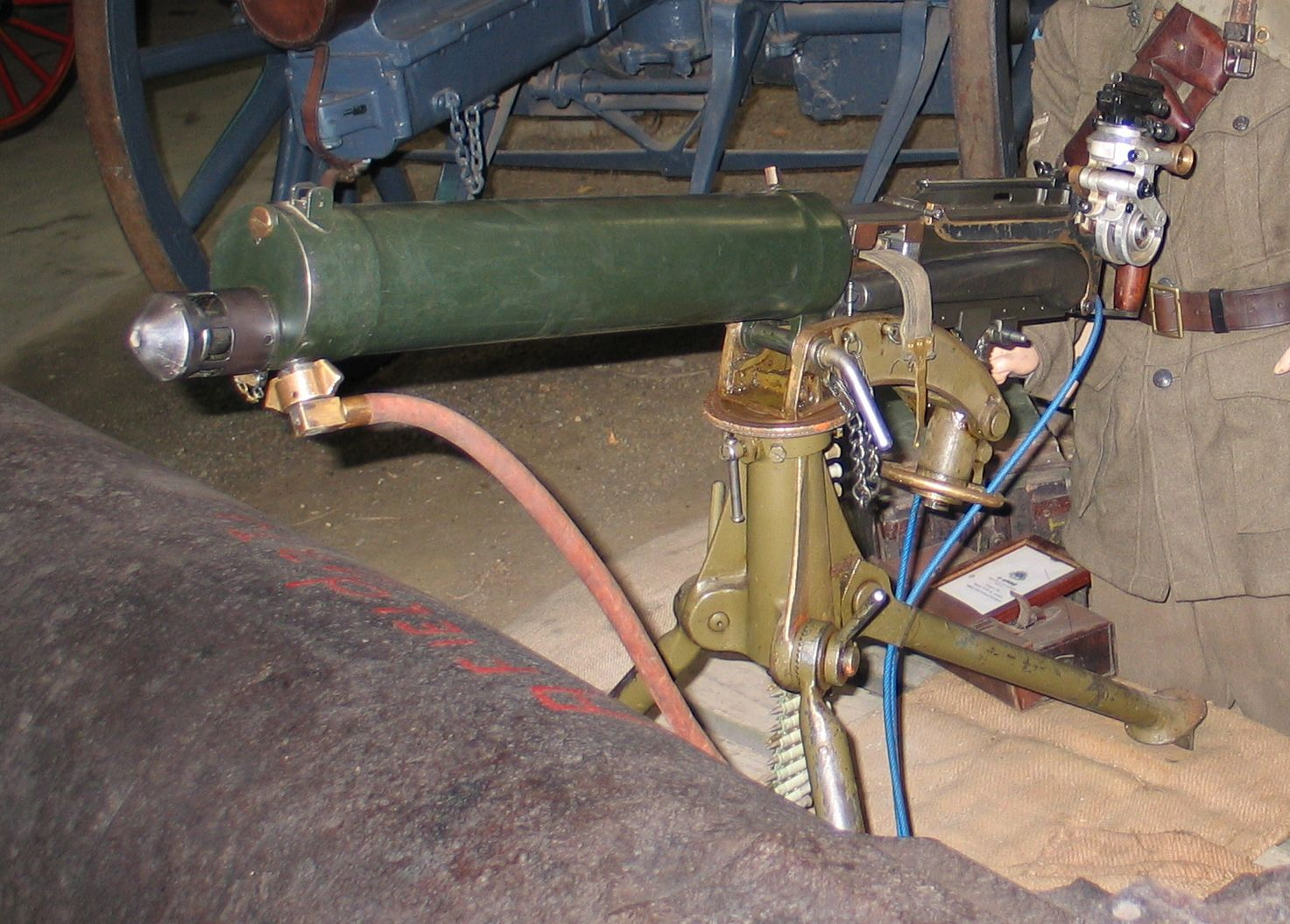
- Vickers machine gun
- Active: 15 July 1916 – 30 June 1919
- Country: New Zealand
- Allegiance: British Empire
- Branch: New Zealand Army
- Size: Squadron
- Part of: New Zealand Mounted Rifles Brigade
- Engagements: First World War: Sinai and Palestine Campaign

Commanders
- (1916–1918): Robin P Harper
- (1918–1919): Arthur Charles Hinman

The 1st Machine Gun Squadron was a sub-unit of the New Zealand Military Forces during the First World War. It was part of the New Zealand Mounted Rifles Brigade, and served with them in the Sinai and Palestine Campaign from 1916 to 1918.

The squadron was formed in Egypt during 1916 by amalgamating three machine gun sections, belonging to three separate regiments: the Auckland Mounted Rifles, the Canterbury Mounted Rifles and the Wellington Mounted Rifles. Each section was initially equipped with two Maxim guns but following their experience in the Gallipoli Campaign, where the value of the guns in attack and defence was realised, their strength was increased to four guns.

The squadron primarily fought against the forces of the Ottoman Turkish Empire, first in Egypt during 1916, then in Palestine and the Jordan Valley in 1917 to 1918.

== Background ==
In common with the other national armies in the British Empire, in January 1916 the New Zealand Expeditionary Force was required to form the New Zealand Machine Gun Corps. The corps would initially have three companies to serve with the New Zealand Division and a squadron to serve with the New Zealand Mounted Rifles Brigade.

The origins of the 1st Machine Gun Squadron can be traced back to the raising of three machine gun sections, belonging to three different regiments. These regiments were: the Auckland Mounted Rifles, recruited from the region around Auckland on the North Island of New Zealand; the Canterbury Mounted Rifles, from the Canterbury region on the South Island of New Zealand; and the Wellington Mounted Rifles from the region around Wellington, also on the North Island. In August 1914, when the sections were formed, they each consisted of two Maxim guns, with one officer in command, and twenty-six other ranks, mounted on twenty riding horses and sixteen draught horses.

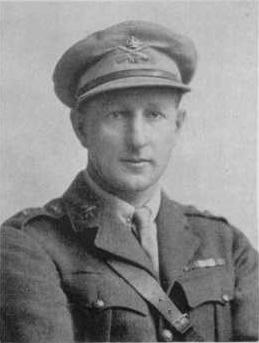
Captain Robin Harper

=== Formation ===
On 15 July 1916, the three mounted regiments lost their machine gun sections, which were amalgamated to form the brigade Machine Gun Squadron, commanded by Captain Robin P. Harper, DSO, DCM, MC, who had previously been the Brigade Machine Gun Officer. All the men, horses and their equipment were transferred and were in place by 24 July, when the squadron began training. However, a shortage of equipment meant that they only had six of the newer Vickers machine guns, and six older Maxim guns, which on operations, when not being used, were transported on pack horses. The full establishment of the Machine Gun Squadron was eight officers, 222 other ranks and 321 horses. By way of comparison, the regiments they had come from only had an establishment of 523 all ranks. Gun crews normally comprised five or six men. The No.1 in action fired the gun and when needed carried the tripod. The No.2 carried the gun itself, and in action fed the ammunition belt into the gun. Two men, No.3 and No.4, carried all the extra ammunition. There was also a range finder and sometimes a scout or spare man for the gun. Other men in the section were detailed to look after their horses. So well did they perform during operations, by the end of the war the squadron had earned the reputation of being the "most efficient unit" in the New Zealand Mounted Rifles Brigade.
