= 8th (South Canterbury) Mounted Rifles =

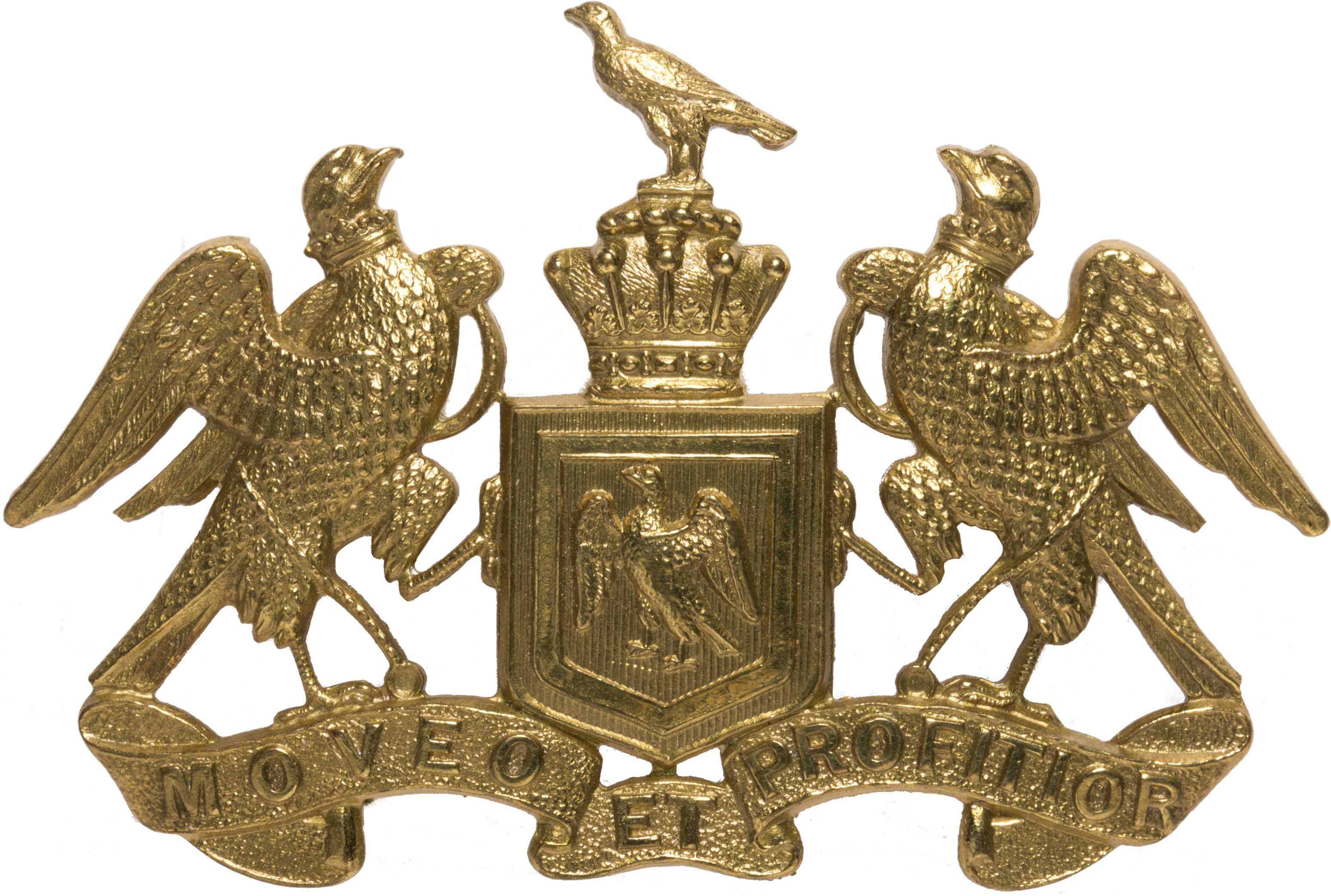
- Cap badge of the 8th (South Canterbury) Mounted Rifles
- Active: 1911–1921
- Country: New Zealand
- Allegiance: New Zealand Crown
- Branch: New Zealand Army
- Role: Mounted
- Size: Regiment
- Part of: New Zealand Mounted Rifles Brigade
- Engagements: World War I

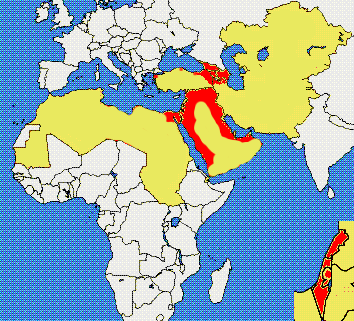
Middle Eastern Theatre during the Great War

The 8th (South Canterbury) Mounted Rifles was formed on March 17, 1911. They were mobilised during World War I as a squadron of the Canterbury Mounted Rifles Regiment. They served in the Middle Eastern theatre of World War I and first saw action during the Battle of Gallipoli. As a part of the larger New Zealand Mounted Rifles Brigade (of the ANZAC Mounted Division) they went on to serve in the Sinai and Palestine Campaign.

== Great War Battles ==
- Battle of Gallipoli
- Battle of Romani
- Battle of Magdhaba
- Battle of Rafa
- First Battle of Gaza
- Second Battle of Gaza
- Third Battle of Gaza
- Battle of Beersheba
- Battle of Megiddo (1918)

== Between the Wars ==
In 1921 they amalgamated with the 1st Mounted Rifles (Canterbury Yeomanry Cavalry) and became the 1st New Zealand Mounted Rifles (Canterbury Yeomanry Cavalry).
