= 1st Mounted Rifles =

1st Mounted Rifles (Canterbury Yeomanry Cavalry)
- Active: 1911–1944
- Country: New Zealand
- Allegiance: New Zealand Crown
- Branch: New Zealand Army
- Role: Mounted Rifles
- Size: One Regiment
- Part of: New Zealand Mounted Rifles Brigade
- Engagements: World War I

The 1st Mounted Rifles (Canterbury Yeomanry Cavalry) were a mounted rifles regiment raised just before World War I, raised and based in the region of Canterbury. It can trace its history back to 1864 with the formation of the Canterbury Yeomanry Cavalry.

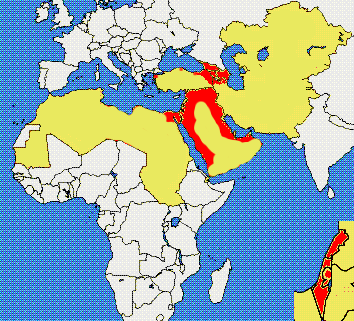
Middle Eastern Theatre during the Great War

== History ==
=== Origins and formation ===
The Canterbury Yeomanry Cavalry was established as a volunteer corps at Christchurch in 1864. It was the oldest of twelve light cavalry units raised in New Zealand during the second half of the nineteenth century, using the British Yeomanry regiments as a model.

While numbering less than 100 men, scattered in small detachments across Canterbury Province, the unit earned a reputation for well drilled smartness and provided honour guards and ceremonial escorts as required. It was brought together for a training camp of eight days each year. A scarlet and blue uniform was worn with black facings and a red plumed helmet.

With the introduction of a conscription-based territorial system in 1911-12, the Canterbury Yeomanry Cavalry became "A" Squadron of the 1st Mounted Rifles (Canterbury Yeomanry Cavalry). Following this, the regiment was formed on 17 March 1911.

=== World War I ===
They were mobilised during World War I as a squadron of the Canterbury Mounted Rifles Regiment. They served in the Middle Eastern theatre of World War I and first saw action during the Battle of Gallipoli.

As a part of the larger New Zealand Mounted Rifles Brigade (of the ANZAC Mounted Division) they went on to serve in the Sinai and Palestine Campaign.

The battle they participated in were

- Battle of Gallipoli
- Battle of Romani
- Battle of Magdhaba
- Battle of Rafa
- First Battle of Gaza
- Second Battle of Gaza
- Third Battle of Gaza
- Battle of Beersheba
- Battle of Megiddo (1918)

=== Between the wars ===
In 1921 they were amalgamated with the 8th (South Canterbury) Mounted Rifles and redesignated the Canterbury Yeomanry Cavalry. By 1942, the regiment, as 1st Light Armoured Fighting Vehicles Regiment (Canterbury Yeomanry Cavalry), was part of the 5th Division's divisional troops, located at Ashburton.

They were absorbed into the 3rd Armoured Regiment on 29 March 1944.

== Alliances ==
- United Kingdom – 12th Royal Lancers
