= Katia, Egypt =

Coordinates: 30°58′00″N 32°45′00″E

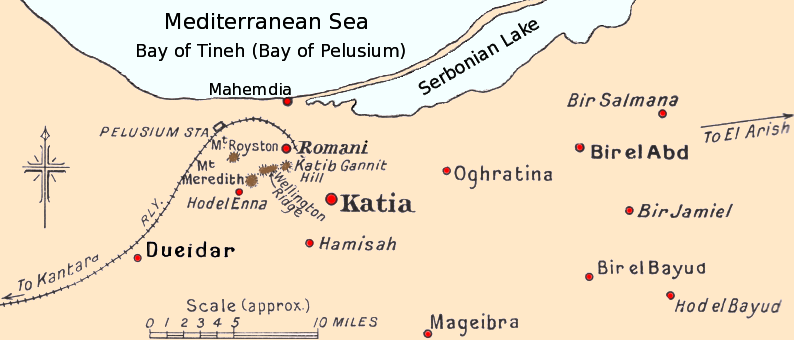
Katia in the Sinai Desert

Katia is located in the Egyptian Sinai Desert. The Moroccan traveller Ibn Battuta reported that in 1326 on the route to Gaza, the Egyptian authorities had a customs post at katia on the north coast of Sinai. Here Bedouin were being used to guard the road and track down those trying to cross the border without permission. In 1916, the Battle of Katia was fought there between the forces of the British Empire defending the Suez Canal and the invading Ottoman Turkish Empire.
