= Battle of Ayun Kara =

1917 battle

- Part of the Middle Eastern theatre of the First World War
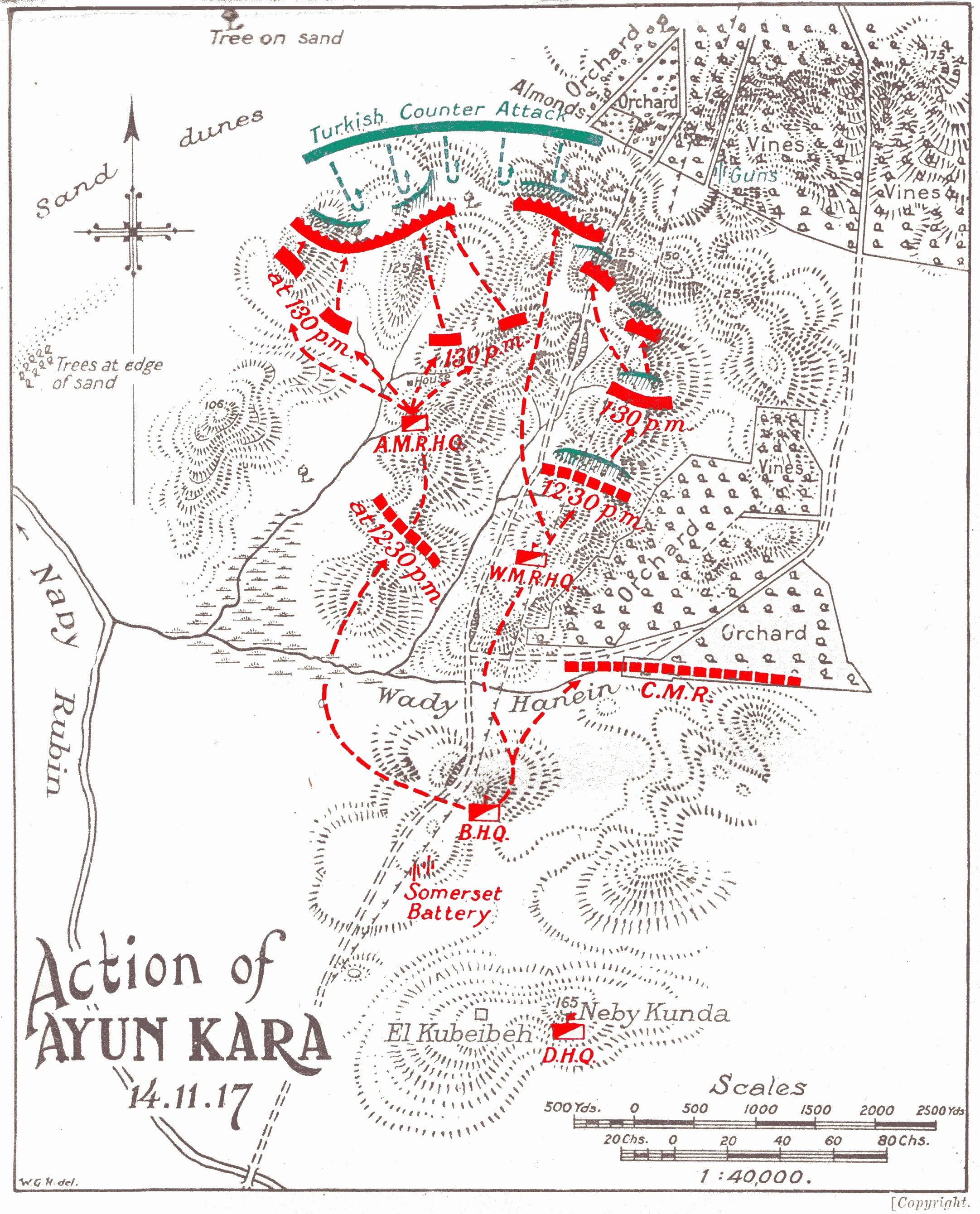
- Map showing the positions of the Ottoman and New Zealand forces during the battle
Date	14 November 1917
Location	Ayun Kara 31°56′54″N 34°46′32″E
Result	New Zealand victory

Belligerents
Dominion of New Zealand	Ottoman Empire

Commanders and leaders
William Meldrum	Unknown

Units involved
~1,940 troops New Zealand Mounted Rifles Brigade 4.5in shrapnel artillery battery	~1,500 troops 18 machine-guns artillery battery 3rd Infantry Division

Casualties and losses
44 dead 141 wounded	182 dead (Possibly 400); 300 wounded 34 prisoners of war 5 machine-guns captured 2 Lewis guns recovered

The Battle of Ayun Kara (14 November 1917) was an engagement in the Sinai and Palestine Campaign during the First World War. The battle was fought between the New Zealand Mounted Rifles Brigade and a similar-sized rearguard from the Turkish 3rd Infantry Division, which was part of the XXII Corps of the Ottoman Eighth Army under Kress von Kressenstein. (Note: At the time of the First World War, the modern Turkish state did not exist, and instead it was part of the Ottoman Turkish Empire. While the terms have distinct historical meanings, within many English-language sources the terms "Turkey" and "Ottoman Empire" are used synonymously, although sources differ in their approaches. The sources used in this article predominantly use the term "Turkey".)

Following their success in the battles of Beersheba, Gaza, and Mughar Ridge, the Egyptian Expeditionary Force was pursuing the retreating Turkish forces north. The New Zealanders, part of the ANZAC Mounted Division, were on the division's left heading towards Rishon LeZion, when nine miles (14 km) south of Jaffa they encountered the Turkish rearguard on the edge of sand dunes to the west of the villages of Surafend el Harab and Ayun Kara. The Turkish forces consisted of around 1,500 infantry, supported by machine-guns and artillery.

The battle started in the afternoon with the New Zealanders caught in the open. Despite Turkish artillery, machine-gun fire, and infantry assaults, the New Zealanders gradually fought their way forward.

The New Zealanders won the battle for the cost of 44 dead and 81 wounded. The Turkish casualties were 182 dead and an unknown number of wounded, but it was their last attempt to secure their lines of communications. By that night the Turks were in full retreat and soon after the Egyptian Expeditionary Force occupied Jerusalem.

== Background ==
At the end of October 1917, the Egyptian Expeditionary Force (EEF) began their third assault to capture the port of Gaza on the Palestinian Mediterranean coast. Their first objective was to capture Beersheba on the British right flank, then move west rolling up the Gaza–Beersheba defence line. At the same time leaving some of their mounted forces, positioned on the right to pursue, northwards, the withdrawing Turkish forces.

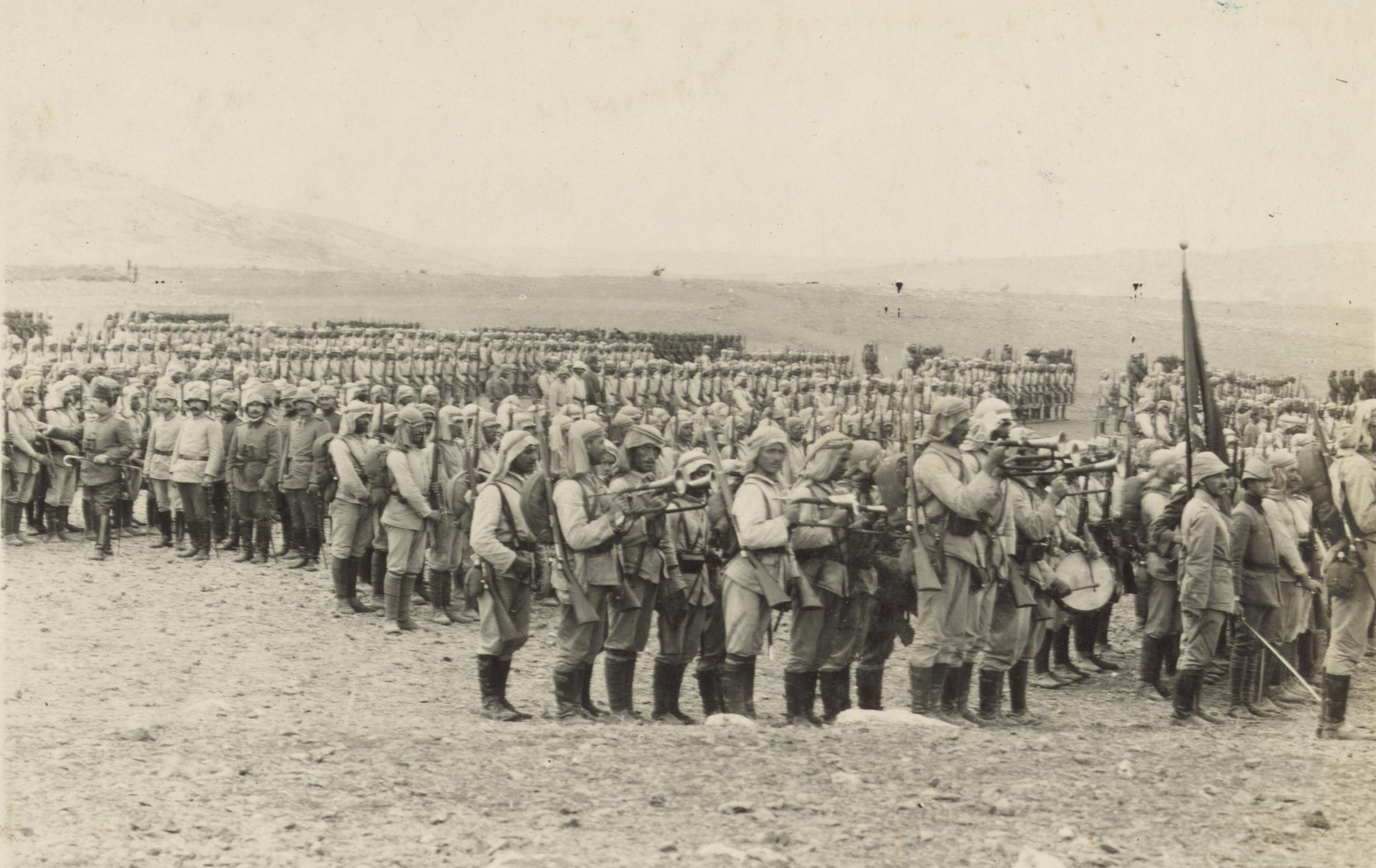
Turkish Army troops, on the Plain of Esdraelon in 1914

One of the formations left on the right flank was the New Zealand Mounted Rifles Brigade, consisting of the Auckland Mounted Rifles, the Canterbury Mounted Rifles, the Wellington Mounted Rifles, and the 1st Machine-Gun Squadron. The brigade was a mounted infantry unit and had an establishment of 1,940 men, but more importantly, when dismounted, its rifle strength was only the equivalent of an infantry battalion. The New Zealanders remained on the right until the 10 November, when they were ordered to leave Beersheba and rejoin the ANZAC Mounted Division. This entailed a move of sixty miles (97 km) across country. The journey took them two days and it was not until, 22:00 on 12 November that they arrived at the division's night time bivouac. They were then ordered to pursue the Turkish forces north. Their objectives were to capture Ramla and Ludd, and interdict the road between Jaffa and Jerusalem. Starting out the next afternoon, the brigade moved north and crossed the River Sukerior unopposed, camping that night on the northern bank. They resumed their advance the next morning, now heading towards Ayun Kara.

Aware they would be pursued, the Turks attempted to stop the EEF following them too closely. About nine miles (14 km) south of Jaffa around 1,500 Turkish troops from the 3rd Infantry Division, supported by eighteen machine-guns and an artillery battery, had formed a position to cover their withdrawing forces. The position was located on the edge of an area of sand dunes to the north of El Kubeibeh and west of the villages of Surafend el Harab and Ayun Kara.

== Battle ==
The Turkish rearguard made a determined stand in well chosen terrain. The engagement took place on the edge of sand dunes to the north of El Kubeibeh and west of the villages of Surafend el Harab and Ayun Kara. Attacking the Ottoman infantry division was the New Zealand Mounted Rifles Brigade. In the centre were the Auckland Mounted Rifles and the Wellington Mounted Rifles, who had a combined strength of about 1,000 combatants, plus 200 horse holders. On the right of this engagement the Canterbury Mounted Rifles was held up and heavily engaged in the orange groves of the Wadi Hanein near Nes Ziyona until late in the afternoon. They successfully covered the right of the Auckland and Wellington regiments pushing large bodies of Ottoman soldiers back through the orchards of the Wadi Hanein and eventually won the village. On the right of these engagements, after the 1st Light Horse Brigade had secured Yebna, the brigade encountered Ottoman units defending the Jewish colony of Deiran. The brigade pushed the defenders back into the village which the New Zealanders eventually occupied.

To the west of the Wadi Hanein the Auckland and Wellington Mounted Rifles at first advanced quickly over the more open but hilly country, their left on the edge of the dunes with the Somerset Battery (RHA) supporting them from north of El Kubeibeh. But they soon encountered a substantial entrenched infantry position of the Ottoman 3rd Division on a high ridge one side of which was a steep face to the orange groves and the other sloped gradually towards the sand dunes. The ridge formed an inverted "L," the long side reaching towards the approaching New Zealanders, while the short side bent westward until it reached the sand dunes.

By noon the situation had developed and Meldrum, commanding the New Zealand Brigade, ordered an attack by the Wellington Mounted Rifles in the centre to gain contact with the main Ottoman entrenched position. The Auckland Mounted Rifles advanced on the Wellingtons left towards the foot of the "L", but suffered very heavy machine-gun fire from the long ridge against the end of which the Wellingtons were pressing.

By 13:30 the Wellington Mounted Rifles had gained a footing on the ridge by rapidly capturing small tactical positions at the gallop. They achieved their objective by successive rushes driving the Ottoman defenders back from their main position. Major Wilder's 9th Squadron supported by the 2nd Squadron had rushed the first Ottoman position with the bayonet; one machine-gun and one Lewis gun were captured. These guns were used against the second position which was captured by another bayonet charge; two more machine-guns being captured. The third Ottoman position situated well along the long side of the ridge was then attacked. But Red Knoll, located close to the junction with the short leg and practically in front of the dividing line between the two regiments, poured fire directly on them all. (Note: See 'Action of Ayun Kara' Map above. Red Knoll is indicated by an oblong outlined in green.)

This central position was covered by an Ottoman artillery battery which was run forward under cover of trees and opened fire at a range of 1,200 yards (1,100 m) delaying the New Zealanders' attack. Shortly after 14:00 while the Aucklands was pushing small groups up along the sand dunes, Ottoman soldiers were discovered gathering in a basin in front of the Auckland and Wellington regiments but just over and behind the short leg of the "L" and completely out of sight of both regiments. Ottoman reinforcements were also seen by the ANZAC Mounted Division headquarters at Neby Kunda and reported to the attacking regiments. But there was no reserve or reinforcements available to the New Zealanders as 2nd Light Horse Brigade had been attached to the Australian Mounted Division during the attack on Junction Station the day before.

Every available man including signallers, gallopers, batmen, grooms and messengers were formed into a troop in case they were needed. The 3rd Squadron, led by Major Twistleton, galloped forward to within a few yards of the heavily attacked line; he was mortally wounded in the charge. About this time Ottoman defenders were driven back from the third position and the New Zealanders gained practically the whole of the long ridge south of the orange groves of Rishon le Ziyon. At 14:30 a counter-attack was launched against the Wellington Regiment and beaten off by enfilading cross fire from both the Wellington and Auckland regiments' machine-guns.

Another counter-attack a quarter of an hour later by two companies of between 200 and 300 Ottoman soldiers armed with hand grenades was launched against the Auckland Regiment. They charged with fixed bayonets approaching in places to within fifteen yards (14 m) throwing their hand grenades or bombs, in a determined effort to turn the New Zealanders' left flank. A group of Ottoman soldiers reoccupied a small hill on which all New Zealanders had been killed or wounded, firing obliquely on the Auckland Regiment's main position. The fierce intensity of the fight continued at close quarters for some time with well-sited Ottoman machine-guns handled with skill and boldness enfilading the New Zealanders. The machine-gun on Red Knoll continued to cause very heavy losses until it was captured by a troop of 2nd Squadron, Wellington Regiment, commanded by Captain Herrick (killed in the engagement), which made a mounted charge at the gallop to the foot of the knoll where they dismounted and charged up to engage the defenders in hand-to-hand fighting. With the capture of the knoll two remaining troops of Herrick's squadron came up and brought to bear heavy fire on the Ottoman soldiers in front of the Auckland Regiment.

== Aftermath ==
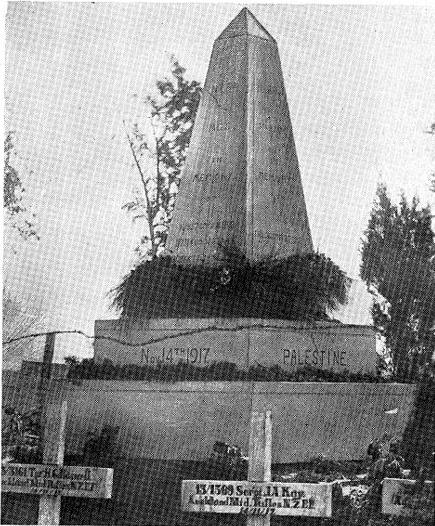
The memorial erected by the people of Richon le Zion to the memory of the New Zealanders who fell on 14 November 1917

By 16:15 fighting had been going on for two and three quarter hours when a squadron of the Wellington Regiment carried out a bayonet charge against a close Ottoman position. It was too much for the Ottoman units whose fighting strength gave way. They fell back beyond Ayun Kara pursued by rifle and machine-gun fire as neither regiment was in a fit state to follow. The Ottoman 3rd Division left behind some 400 dead in front of the Auckland's position alone; although others have quoted totals of between 150 and 162 Ottoman dead. The New Zealanders captured great numbers of machine-guns (some with prismatic sights) including two Lewis guns. Their casualties numbered 175; three officers and twenty-nine other ranks killed, eleven officers and 132 other ranks wounded with the Auckland Regiment suffering eighty-nine of those casualties.
