= List of ambassadors of Israel to the United Kingdom =

Ambassador of Israel to the United Kingdom
- שגריר ישראל בבריטניה
- Coat of arms of Israel
- Incumbent; The post is currently vacant
- Nominator: Prime Minister of Israel
- Inaugural holder: Mordechai Ali'ash
- Formation: 1949

The ambassador from Israel to the United Kingdom is Israel's foremost diplomatic representative in the United Kingdom. The Ambassador is based at the Embassy of Israel, London.

== Ambassadors ==
- 1949–1950: Mordechai Eliash
- 1950–1959: Eliahu Eilat
- 1960–1965: Arthur Lurie
- 1965–1970: Aharon Remez
- 1970–1973: Michael Comay
- 1973–1977: Gideon Rafael
- 1977–1979: Avraham Kidron
- 1979–1982: Shlomo Argov
- 1983–1988: Yehuda Avner
- 1988–1993: Yoav Biran
- 1993–1998: Moshe Raviv
- 1998–2000: Dror Zeigerman
- 2001–2004: Zvi Stauber
- 2004–2007: Zvi Heifetz
- 2007–2011: Ron Prosor
- 2011–2015: Daniel Taub
- 2016–2020: Mark Regev
- 2020–2025: Tzipi Hotovely
- 2026–present:

== See also ==
- Israel–United Kingdom relations
