= Sarafand =

Sarafand or Sarafend (Ṣarafand / صرفند) is an Arabic rendition of the Phoenician place-name *Ṣrpt.

== Places ==
- Sarafand, Lebanon, also spelled Sarafend
  - Sarepta, an ancient Phoenician city at the location of the modern Lebanese town
- Tzrifin, area in central Israel previously known as "Sarafand" or "Sarafend", which used to contain two namesake Palestinian villages:
  - Sarafand al-Amar, 1920s–1940s site of Sarafand/Sarafend, the largest British military base in the Middle East
  - Sarafand al-Kharab
- Al-Sarafand, a Palestinian village near Haifa

== Other uses ==
- Short Sarafand, a British 1930s biplane flying boat
- West Nile virus: the Sarafend strain, one of its deadly strains
