= Eliahu Eilat =

Israeli diplomat (1903–1990)

Eliahu Elath
- אליהו אילת
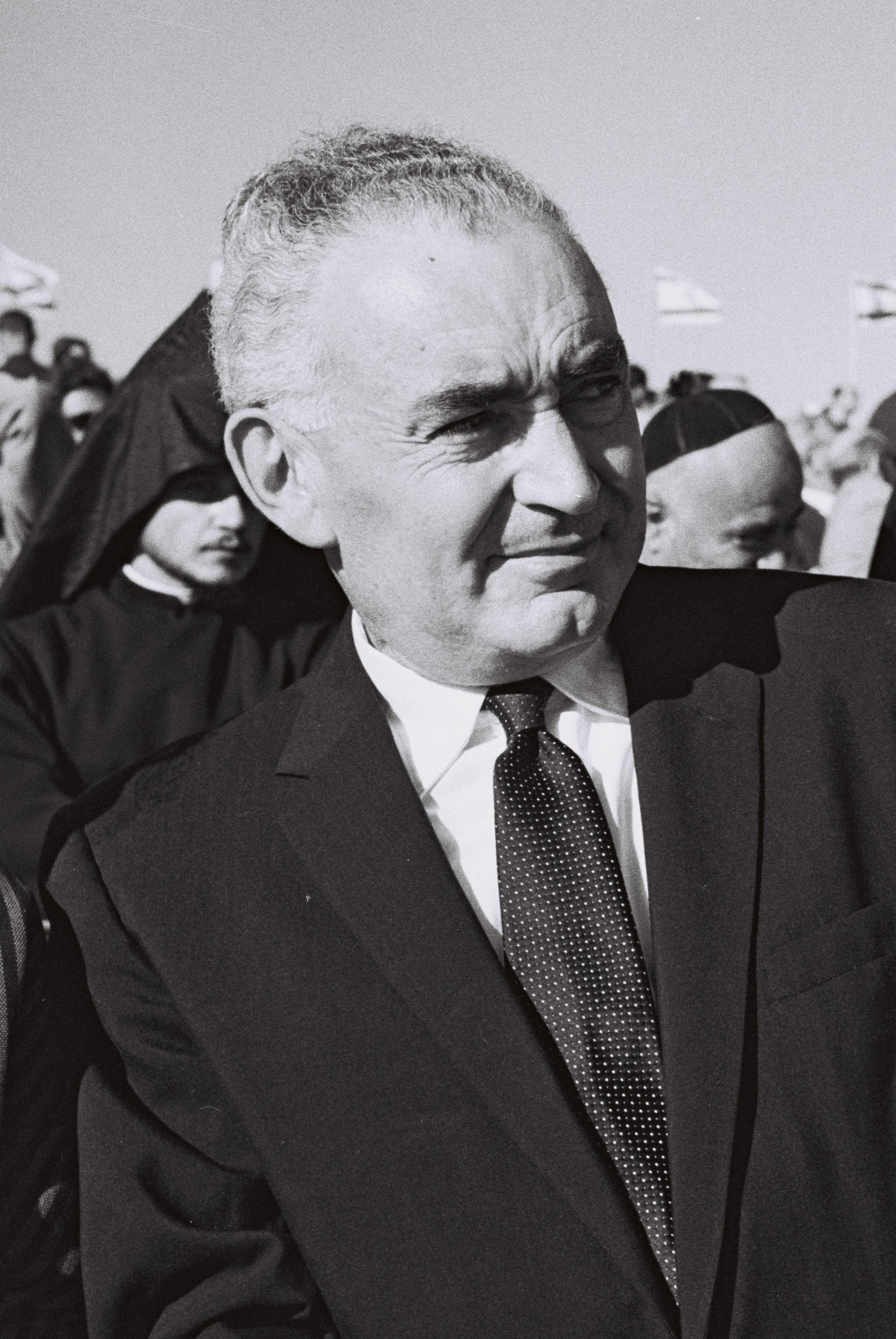
- Elath in 1958 as Israeli Ambassador to the UK

2nd Israeli Ambassador to the United Kingdom
- In office 1950–1959
- President: Chaim Weizmann; Yitzhak Ben-Zvi
- Prime Minister: David Ben-Gurion; Moshe Sharett
- Preceded by: Mordechai Ali'ash
- Succeeded by: Arthur Lurie

1st Israeli Ambassador to the United States
- In office 1948–1950
- President: Chaim Weizmann
- Prime Minister: David Ben-Gurion
- Succeeded by: Abba Eban

Personal details
- Born: July 16, 1903 Snovsk, Chernigov Governorate, Russian Empire
- Died: June 21, 1990 (aged 86) Jerusalem, Israel
- Citizenship: Israel
- Education: University of Kiev
- Occupation: President of the Hebrew University of Jerusalem

Eliahu Elath, born Ilya Menakhemovich Epstein (Hebrew: אליהו אילת, Russian: Илья Менахемович Эпштейн, romanized: Ilja Menahemovič Epštejn; 16 July 1903 – 21 June 1990) was an Israeli diplomat and Orientalist. In 1948 he became the first Israeli ambassador to the United States, and between 1950 and 1959, he was Israel's ambassador to the United Kingdom. He was the President of the Hebrew University of Jerusalem from 1962 to 1968.

== Biography ==
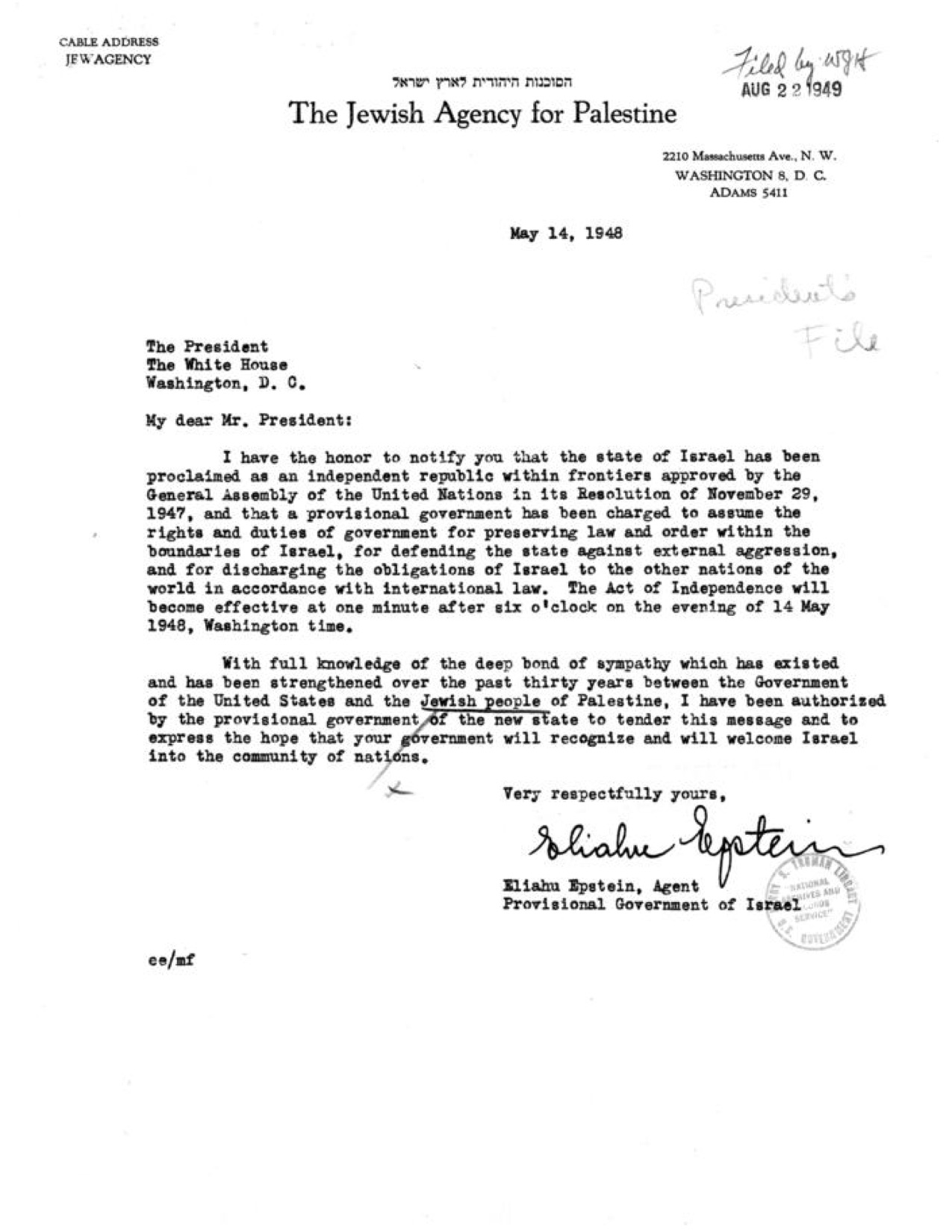
Epstein informed Harry S. Truman of the Israeli Declaration of Independence, which he wrote had been proclaimed "within the frontiers approved by the General Assembly of the United Nations in its Resolution of November 29, 1947". Epstein requested US recognition of the new state.

Born in the Russian Empire (now Ukraine) as Ilya Menakhemovich Epstein, Elath immigrated from the Soviet Union to Mandatory Palestine in 1924. He then spent a decade as a student and journalist in Beirut

== Diplomatic career ==
=== Jewish Agency ===
By 1934, Eilat was the director of the Jewish Agency for Palestine's Middle East Department, which promoted and facilitated Jewish settlement in Palestine. During World War II, Eilat visited Burma to meet with allied military leaders, including Major-General Orde Wingate. Elath was unaware that Wingate was a nudist and was said to have been "scarred for life by his experience of discussing Zionism for an hour and a half with a completely naked man".

=== Washington, D.C. and Ambassador to the United States ===
In 1945, he became the head of the Jewish Agency's Political Office in Washington, D.C. That same year he came to the United States as the agency's representative in Washington, D.C. From 1948 to 1950 he served as the first Israeli ambassador to the United States. Eilat sought and received President Truman’s recognition of Israel's establishment as a state in May 1948.

=== Ambassador to the United Kingdom ===
Following that appointment he served as the Israeli ambassador to the United Kingdom from 1950 to 1959. He was the president of Hebrew University from 1962 to 1968, following Giulio Racah and succeeded by Avraham Harman.
