= Ayun Kara =

Ayun Kara عيون قارة
- Former village / locality
- Country: Israel
- District: Central District
- First mentioned: 19th century (Ottoman records)
- Incorporated into modern city: 20th century

Ayun Kara (Arabic: ʿUyūn Qāra, عيون قارة) was a small village or locality in the central coastal region of Ottoman Palestine, located near the site of present-day Ness Ziona, Israel. The name means “Springs of Kara” in Arabic, referring to the natural springs in the area. Though the nearby Jewish agricultural colony of Ness Ziona was established in 1883, Ayun Kara remained distinct in Arabic usage and Ottoman administrative geography.

== World War I and the Battle of Ayun Kara ==
Ayun Kara is historically significant as the site of the Battle of Ayun Kara, fought on 14 November 1917 during the Sinai and Palestine Campaign of World War I. The New Zealand Mounted Rifles Brigade, part of the British Empire’s Egyptian Expeditionary Force, engaged retreating Ottoman forces in this battle, which formed part of the British advance toward Jaffa and Jerusalem.

The battle’s name derives from the Arabic place name "Ayun Kara," which was used in Ottoman maps and British military reports. Although Ness Ziona was founded decades earlier, it was a smaller, less prominent settlement at the time, and the battle occurred closer to the area identified as Ayun Kara.

A memorial honoring the New Zealand soldiers who fought and died in the battle stands near the former battlefield within modern Ness Ziona.

== Modern location and geographic clarification ==
Today, the historical site of Ayun Kara is located within the municipal boundaries of Ness Ziona, in Israel’s Central District. It is often mistakenly associated with or confused as part of the nearby city of Rishon LeZion, due to their close proximity and the urban sprawl that has merged much of the region.

In reality, Ayun Kara was located approximately 5–6 kilometers south of Rishon LeZion and closer to Ness Ziona. While both Ness Ziona (founded 1883) and Rishon LeZion (founded 1882) were early Jewish agricultural colonies, the battle and original village site are definitively within the limits of modern Ness Ziona.

== Legacy ==
The name Ayun Kara survives primarily through historical accounts of the World War I battle and scholarly literature concerning Ottoman Palestine. The area has since been urbanized and incorporated fully into Ness Ziona’s modern infrastructure. The battlefield memorial remains one of the few reminders of Ayun Kara’s historical presence.

== See also ==
- Sinai and Palestine Campaign
- Ness Ziona
- Rishon LeZion
- New Zealand Mounted Rifles Brigade
