= Daniel Taub =

Israeli diplomat, lawyer, and writer (born 1962)

- דניאל טאוב
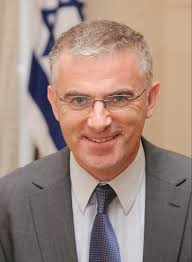

Israeli Ambassador to the United Kingdom
- In office June 2011 – September 2015
- President: Shimon Peres; Reuven Rivlin
- Prime Minister: Benjamin Netanyahu
- Preceded by: Ron Prosor
- Succeeded by: Mark Regev

Personal details
- Born: 1962 (age 63–64) London, England
- Citizenship: Israeli
- Education: University College, Oxford; University College London; Harvard University

Military service
- Allegiance: Israel
- Branch/service: Israel Defense Forces

Daniel Taub (Hebrew: דניאל טאוב; born 1962) is an Israeli diplomat, international lawyer and writer of British origin who served as Israel's ambassador to the United Kingdom from 2011 to 2015. He served as director of strategy and planning at the Yad Hanadiv (Rothschild) Foundation in Jerusalem from 2015 to 2021.

== Early life ==
Daniel Taub was born and raised in London. He attended secondary school at the Haberdashers' Aske's Boys' School in Elstree, Hertfordshire, and thereafter studied at University College, Oxford, University College, London and Harvard University.

Taub moved to Israel in 1989. He served as a combat medic in the Israel Defense Forces (IDF), and subsequently as a reserve officer in the IDF Military Advocate General Office's international law division. Soon after arriving in Israel, Taub worked as speechwriter for President Chaim Herzog. Taub joined the Israeli Foreign Ministry in 1991.

== Diplomatic career ==
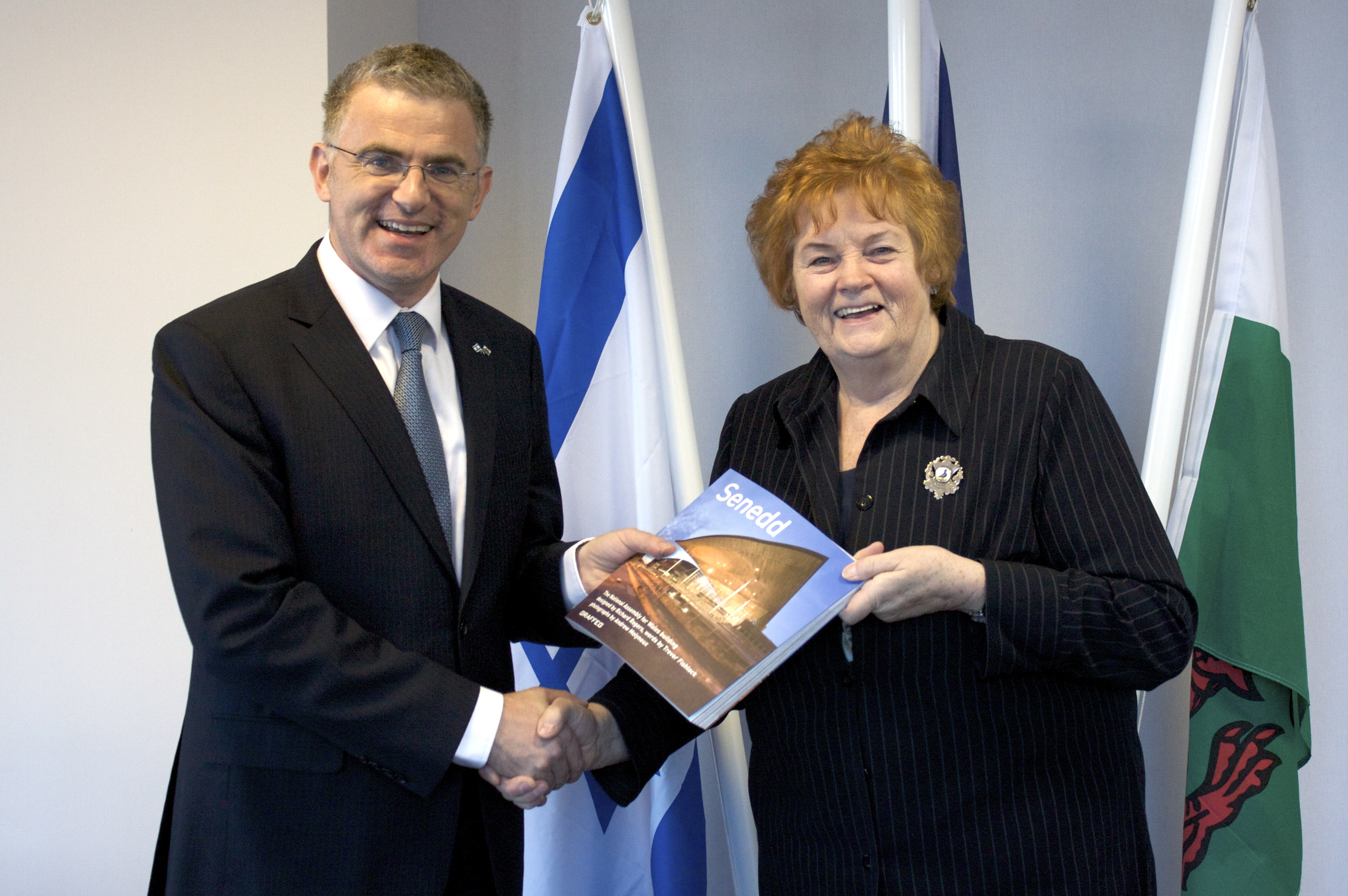
Daniel Taub (left) with the Presiding Officer of the Senedd Cymru – Welsh Parliament; 2012

Taub has held many diplomatic, legal and political posts in the Israeli Foreign Ministry. He is an expert in international law, with specialisations in counter-terrorism and the laws of war. As Principal Deputy Legal Advisor of Israel's Ministry of Foreign Affairs, Taub served as legal adviser to Israel's missions to the United Nations in New York and Geneva, and represented Israel in many multilateral fora.

Taub was a negotiator in the Israeli-Palestinian peace process, and a member of Israel's negotiation team in the Israel-Syrian negotiations. He headed Israel's observer delegation to the International Court of Justice hearings on Israel's security barrier, represented Israel before the UN investigative committee on the 2010 Gaza flotilla raid, and negotiated the entry of Israel's Red Cross society, Magen David Adom, into the International Red Cross Movement, after 70 years of exclusion.

== Ambassador to the UK ==
In 2011, Taub was appointed ambassador to London. Placing a strong emphasis on trade and technology links, Taub introduced the Bizcamp start-up competition in conjunction with Google and was nominated for the Grassroot Diplomat Initiative Award for developing business and trade. Between the years 2011 and 2013, UK-Israel bilateral trade increased to $8 billion.

Taub is a lecturer and public speaker. He has been interviewed widely on television including on Hardtalk, CNN, Newsnight, Sky News, and the BBC Radio 4's Today programme, and was the first Israeli ambassador to be interviewed on the BBC Persian service. In addition to serving as ambassador to the UK, in March 2013 Taub became Israel's first ambassador to the International Maritime Organization, which is based in London.

Taub returned to Israel when his appointment as ambassador ended in 2015. Later, The Guardian reported that British security officials had complained to the embassy about security breaches involving unauthorised visitors during his tenure. The Israeli Foreign Ministry conducted an internal enquiry, concluding while there had been a breach in protocol, there had been no wrongdoing.

== Personal life ==
Taub and his wife Zehava live in Jerusalem. They have six children.

== Media career ==
=== Articles ===
Taub has written articles on Israel, the Middle East, and the Jewish World.

- Taub, Daniel (20 September 2011). "Grandstanding won't win peace. Talking will". The Times. Archived from the original on 9 October 2012.
- Taub, Daniel (20 November 2012). "The Palestinians' UN ploy is just the latest stalling tactic". The Daily Telegraph. Archived from the original on 1 November 2012.
- Taub, Daniel. "Boycotting Israel does not bring peace closer or benefit humanity". The Daily Telegraph. Archived from the original on 25 May 2013.
- Taub, Daniel (8 May 2012). "This TUC boycott has morphed into bigotry". The Guardian. Archived from the original on 14 July 2014.
- Taub, Daniel (20 November 2012). "Halting Hamas | Daniel Taub". HuffPost Politics. Archived from the original on 27 November 2012.
- Taub, Daniel (11 November 2020). "Tribute - Daniel Taub: Studying with Rabbi Sacks". The Pittsburgh Jewish Chronicle.

=== Books ===
- Taub, Daniel (2007). Parasha Diplomatit: An Israeli Diplomatic Perspective on the Weekly Torah Reading. Israel Ministry of Foreign Affairs. A book of diplomatic insights on biblical texts.
- Taub, Daniel (2008). Luci Dalla Tora (in Italian). San Paolo Edizioni.
- Taub, Daniel (2018). La Fede Ebraica (in Italian). San Paolo Edizioni. ISBN 978-8892212985.
- Forthcoming: Taub, Daniel (2025). Beyond Dispute: Rediscovering the Jewish Art of Constructive Disagreement. Hodder & Stoughton.

=== Scripts ===
- קורן-דינר, רוני (13 July 2003). "ערוץ התכלת בשיתוף דרסט הפקות מפיקים טלנובלה חסידית בהשקעה של 800 אלף דולר – מדיה ופרסום". TheMarker.
- Taub was also the creator and chief scriptwriter of an Israeli drama series, HaHatzer, set in an ultra-orthodox Hasidic sect.
- Together with Dan Patterson, Taub wrote the play Winner's Curse, a dark comedy about international peace negotiations.
- Taub wrote the script and lyrics for the jazz musical Last Night in Florence.
