= Shlomo Argov =

Israeli diplomat (1929–2003)

- שלמה ארגוב

Israeli Ambassador to the United Kingdom
- In office 1979–1982
- Preceded by: Avraham Kidron
- Succeeded by: Yehuda Avner

Personal details
- Born: 14 December 1929 Jerusalem, Mandatory Palestine
- Died: 23 February 2003 (aged 73) Jerusalem
- Education: Georgetown University (BS); London School of Economics and Political Science (MA)
- Occupation: Diplomat

Military service
- Branch/service: Israel Defense Forces; Ground Forces
- Years of service: 1948–1950
- Battles/wars: 1948 Arab–Israeli War

Shlomo Argov (Hebrew: שלמה ארגוב; 14 December 1929 – 23 February 2003) was an Israeli diplomat. He was the Israeli ambassador to the United Kingdom, whose attempted assassination led to the 1982 Lebanon War.

== Early life and education ==
Argov was born in Jerusalem in 1929 to the Salomon family that had lived in Jerusalem for ten generations. As a teenager, he joined the Palmach, the elite force of the Haganah. During the 1947–48 Civil War in Mandatory Palestine, he was wounded in the Battle of Safed. When Israel was established and the 1948 Arab–Israeli War broke out, Argov joined the Israel Defense Forces (IDF).

In 1950, he completed his military service and went to the United States to study, receiving a Bachelor of Science degree from the School of Foreign Service at Georgetown University, Washington D.C., in 1952. While studying, he worked part-time at the Israeli Embassy in Washington, where he met his future wife Hava. Afterwards, he went to study in the United Kingdom, and received an MA in international relations from the London School of Economics in 1955.

== Career ==
Argov then returned to Israel, where he spent several years working in the Prime Minister's Office under David Ben-Gurion.

In 1959, Argov joined the Israeli Foreign Ministry, and was appointed consul-general in Lagos, Nigeria; following that country's independence in 1960, he became ambassador. He was later transferred to the Israeli Embassy in Ghana, before joining the Israeli consulate in New York City in 1962. In 1965, he became Deputy-Director of the American Desk at the Foreign Ministry, and was posted at the Israeli Embassy in Washington in 1968. From 1971 to 1974, he served as ambassador to Mexico, and was appointed Deputy Director-General for Information of the Foreign Ministry in Jerusalem when he returned. In 1977, he was appointed ambassador to the Netherlands, and served until 1979.

In September 1979, he was appointed ambassador to the United Kingdom by Prime Minister Menachem Begin. During his three years as ambassador, he "forcefully and articulately put forward Israel's cause to a generally hostile Foreign Office and media". He was highly admired by British Jews, and often visited Jewish communities.

== Personal life ==
Argov had three children with his wife Hava: a son, Gideon, and two daughters, Yehudit and Edna. Hava died in May 2002.

== Attempted assassination ==
Attempted assassination of Shlomo Argov
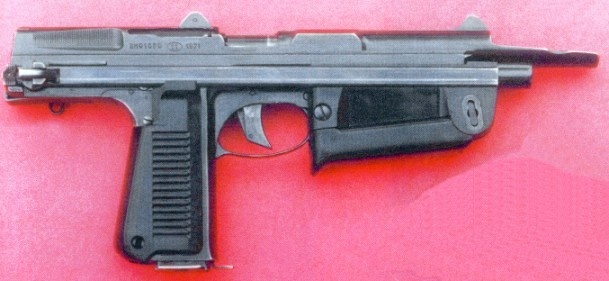
- A PM-63 Machine Pistol, similar to the one used in the assassination attempt
- Location: The Dorchester, London, United Kingdom
- Date: 3 June 1982
- Target: Shlomo Argov
- Attack type: Political assassination, shooting
- Weapon: PM-63 Machine pistol
- Deaths: None
- Injuries: Shlomo Argov (critically injured)
- Perpetrators: Iraqi Intelligence Service; Abu Nidal Organization; Hussein Ghassan Said; Marwan al-Banna; Nawaf al-Rosan

On 3 June 1982, three men, Hussein Ghassan Said, Marwan al-Banna and Nawaf al-Rosan, approached Argov as he got into his car after a banquet at the Dorchester Hotel in Park Lane, London. There is another report stating the presence of a fourth man. Armed with a PM-63 machine pistol, Hussein Ghassan Said shot Argov in the head. Argov was not killed, but he was critically injured. He was rushed to the National Hospital for Neurology and Neurosurgery, where he was transferred to a specialist unit and underwent emergency brain surgery. He remained in a coma for three months.

The attempted assassins were members of the Abu Nidal Organization, a Palestinian splinter group which was hostile to the PLO. The attack was ordered by the Iraqi Intelligence Service. Following the attack, the assassins drove to the Iraqi embassy in London, where they deposited the weapon.

Al-Banna was Abu Nidal's cousin, Said was a Jordanian, and Al-Rosan was an Iraqi intelligence colonel. The gunman, Said, was shot by Argov's bodyguard and also sustained serious head injuries and, like Argov, survived. The two uninjured assassins fled the scene but were arrested shortly afterwards in a London flat. It appeared that they were planning to kill Nabil Ramlawi, the PLO representative in London.

The attackers were convicted, and sentenced to terms of imprisonment ranging from 30 to 35 years. Subsequently two became mentally ill, and were transferred to high security hospitals in the UK. There was some speculation in Israel at the time that the British security services were aware of the plot. Lord Alton of Liverpool failed to draw the government into commenting on the speculation when he raised the issue in the House of Lords.

The attempt on Argov's life triggered the Israeli decision to invade Lebanon three days later to rout Palestinian guerrilla bases. This was intended by the Iraqi authorities, who calculated that an Israeli war in Lebanon would be detrimental to the rival Ba'athist government in Syria—whether Syria intervened on behalf of the Palestinians or not. Israel invaded Lebanon on 6 June. The war saw the expulsion of the Palestine Liberation Organization from Lebanon, although the would-be assassins were not members of the PLO, and their leader, Abu Nidal, had even been sentenced to death in absentia by a PLO court.

== Later life and death ==
After being in a coma for three months, Argov regained consciousness, and was returned to Israel. There, he was placed in the rehabilitation ward at Hadassah Hospital in Jerusalem as a permanent patient. Though paralysed, he initially remained lucid and had newspaper headlines read to him for fifteen minutes at a time. He became devastated when he realised the full extent of his condition. After about three years, he was never fully conscious, and he eventually went blind.

Argov was deeply distressed that the attack on him had provoked the 1982 Lebanon War. In 1983, he dictated to a friend the following statement from his bed in Hadassah Hospital. The statement was later passed on to the Haaretz newspaper: "If those who planned the war had also foreseen the scope of the adventure, they would have spared the lives of hundreds of our best sons ... They brought no salvation ... Israel should go to war only when there is no alternative. Our soldiers should never go to war unless it is vital for survival. We are tired of wars. The nation wants peace."

Argov died at Hadassah Hospital in 2003, aged 73, from the injuries inflicted in the attack. He had been paralysed and in permanent hospital care for 21 years.
