= Mark Regev =

Israeli diplomat and civil servant (born 1960)

- מארק רגב
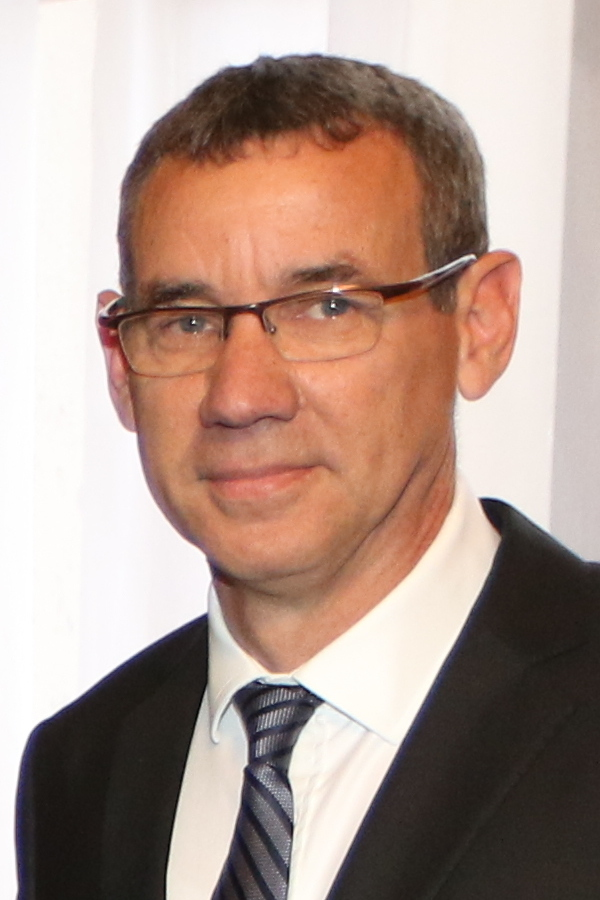

Ambassador of Israel to the United Kingdom
- In office April 2016 – 2020
- President: Reuven Rivlin
- Prime Minister: Benjamin Netanyahu
- Preceded by: Daniel Taub
- Succeeded by: Tzipi Hotovely

Personal details
- Born: Mark Freiberg; 1960 (age 65–66) Melbourne, Victoria, Australia
- Citizenship: Israel
- Spouse: Vered Regev
- Children: 3
- Education: Mount Scopus Memorial College
- Alma mater: Melbourne University; Hebrew University of Jerusalem; Boston University
- Occupation: Diplomat and civil servant

Mark Regev (Hebrew: מארק רגב; born 1960) is an Australian-Israeli diplomat, government advisor and civil servant. Between June 2020 and April 2021, he served as the Prime Minister's Senior Advisor for Foreign Affairs and International Communications. From 2016 to 2020 Regev was Ambassador of Israel to the United Kingdom. Previously, he was the International Spokesperson for the Prime Minister's Office (2007 to 2016).

== Early life ==
Regev was born Mark Freiberg in Melbourne, where he was raised, in Victoria, Australia, in 1960 to Martin and Freda Freiberg, two German Jews. He was educated at Mount Scopus Memorial College, a Jewish day school in Melbourne. He received his bachelor's degree in political science and history at the University of Melbourne, and master's degrees in political science from the Hebrew University of Jerusalem, and in management from Boston University.

In his youth, Freiberg was a prominent member of the Socialist Zionist youth movement Ichud Habonim and was active in the Melbourne University Jewish Students Society. In 1982, he emigrated to Israel and worked at kibbutz Tel Katzir. In Israel, he Hebraicized his surname from Freiberg to Regev. He served as a combat soldier in the Nahal Brigade of the Israel Defense Forces (IDF).

== Career ==
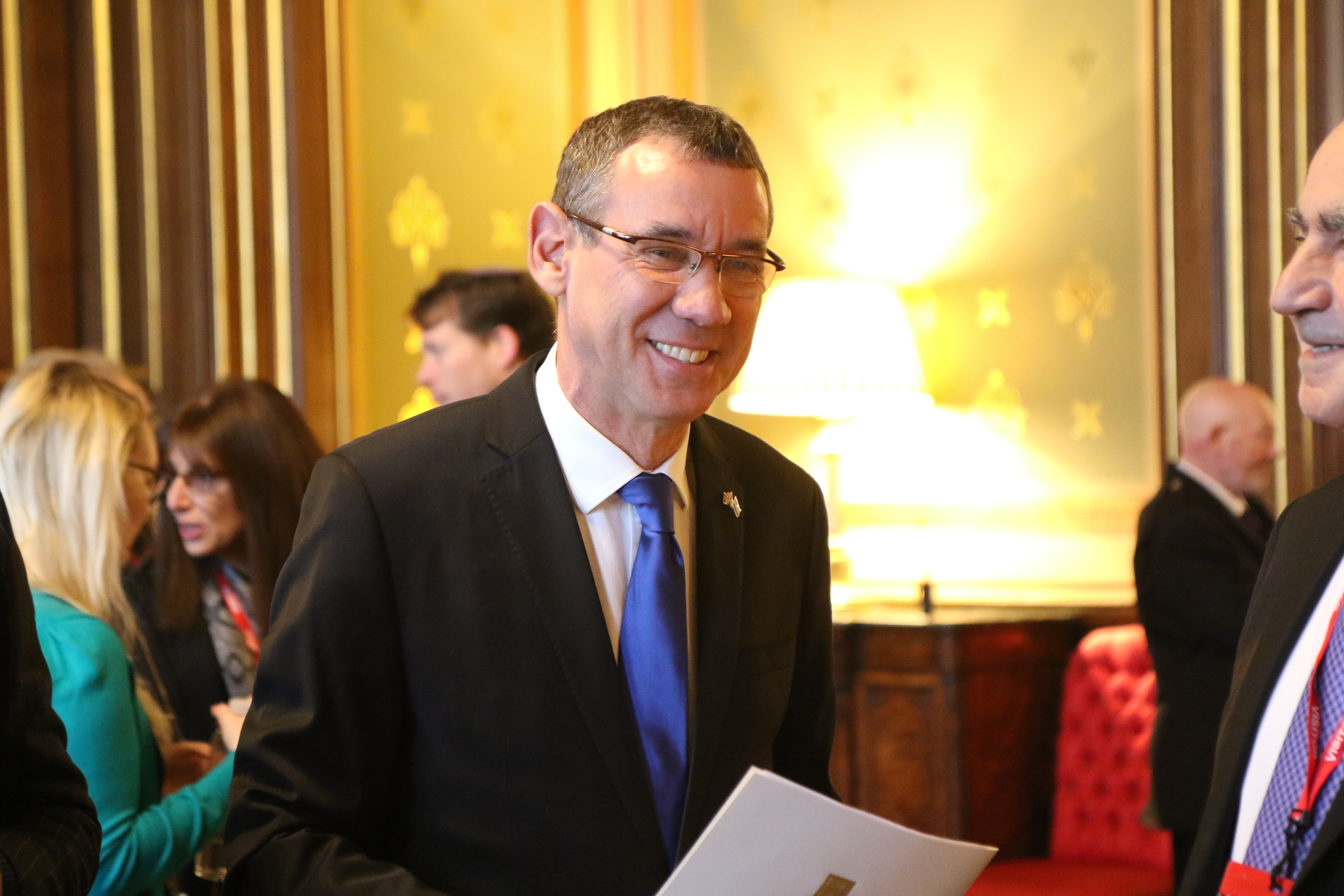
Regev at an International Holocaust Remembrance Day event at the Foreign & Commonwealth Office in London on 23 January 2019.

Regev began his career as a lecturer on international relations and strategy at the Israel Defense Forces Staff College. He joined Israel's Ministry of Foreign Affairs in 1990, serving as deputy chief of mission at the Consulate General in Hong Kong, and spokesman at the Israeli Embassy in Beijing. In 2015 Regev was appointed to replace Daniel Taub as Israel's ambassador to the UK; he officially assumed his position on 4 April 2016.

As ambassador, Regev was involved in interfaith activities. He hosted an iftar dinner at his residence for members of Britain's Muslim leadership. He served as ambassador for four years before returning to Israel in August 2020 to become prime minister Benjamin Netanyahu's Senior Advisor for Foreign Affairs and International Communications, replacing Evan Cohen. Regev was succeeded by Tzipi Hotovely.

In 2022 Regev was appointed to be the chair of the Abba Eban Institute for Diplomacy and Foreign Relations at Reichman University.

Regev has received both prominence and criticism in international media when he has presented the Israeli position in interviews to English language TV and radio channels during the 2006 Lebanon War, the 2008–09 Gaza War, the 2012 Operation Pillar of Defense, the 2014 Israel–Gaza conflict and Operation Brother's Keeper, and the 2021 Operation Guardian of the Walls. In 2020, he described the two-state solution as an "illusion" that could never be implemented successfully.

During the Gaza war, Regev made several controversial remarks about the conflict, including denying Israeli responsibility for the flour massacre and suggesting collective punishment as a means of forcing the release of Israeli hostages. In one interview on MSNBC, host Mehdi Hasan accused Regev and other Israeli government figures of spreading disinformation about civilian casualties in Gaza. Regev appeared on British radio station LBC on 13 January 2024 to call genocide allegations against Israel "preposterous." In the same interview, he described South Africa's genocide case against Israel at the International Court of Justice as "very sad, because they basically decided to become Hamas' lawyer."

Regev is married to Vered Regev. They have three children.

=== Genocide case ===
Amid allegations that Israel was committing genocide in Gaza, Aboriginal activist Robbie Thorpe brought a private prosecution against Regev in 2024. Thorpe accused Regev of "advocating genocide", a crime included in section 80.2D of the Australian Criminal Code. Regev was served in Israel with a Hebrew copy of the charge sheet. The charge was based on remarks Regev made during a radio interview on 10 October 2023 in which he advocated for Israel to cut off the supply of essentials such as food, water and electricity to Gaza. Lawyers for the Israeli government contacted the Commonwealth Director of Public Prosecutions and formally requested the dismissal of the case. On 10 December the DPP's office formally took over the case and withdrew the charges against Regev, a decision which Thorpe said he would appeal.
