= Dror Zeigerman =

Israeli politician

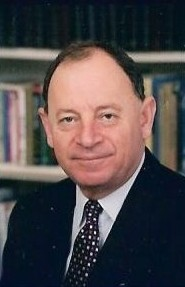
- Zeigerman in 1999

Ambassador to the United Kingdom
- In office 1998–2000

Faction represented in the Knesset
- 1981–1984: Likud

Personal details
- Born: 15 May 1948 (age 78) Nes Ziona, Israel

Dror Zeigerman (Hebrew: דרור זייגרמן; born 15 May 1948) is an Israeli former politician and diplomat who served as a member of the Knesset for Likud between 1981 and 1984, and as ambassador to the United Kingdom from 1998 until 2000.

== Biography ==
Born in Ness Ziona the day after the Declaration of Independence, Zeigerman attended a local high school. He went on to study history and political science at the Hebrew University of Jerusalem, where he became chairman of the university's students' union. He also headed the students section of the World Zionist Organization between 1977 and 1981.

A member of the Liberal Party, Zeigerman served as secretary of the party's Jerusalem branch. In 1981 he was elected to the Knesset on the Likud list (then an alliance of the Liberal Party, Herut and other right-wing factions), and sat on the Foreign Affairs and Defense Committee, the Immigration and Absorption Committee and the Education and Culture Committee. He lost his seat in the 1984 elections.

During the 1990s he worked as the Israeli consul in Toronto, before serving as ambassador to the United Kingdom from 1998 until 2001.
