= Mordechai Eliash =

Israeli attorney and diplomat (1892–1950)

- מרדכי אליאש

Israeli Ambassador to the United Kingdom
- In office 5 April 1949 – 11 March 1950
- Succeeded by: Eliyahu Elath

Israeli Ambassador to the United Nations
- In office 14 May 1948 – 1949
- Succeeded by: Abba Eban

Personal details
- Born: 1892 Uman, Russian Empire
- Died: 11 March 1950 (aged 57–58) London, United Kingdom
- Resting place: Sanhedria Cemetery, Jerusalem
- Children: Rachel, Moshe
- Education: Berlin University; Oxford University (B.Litt)
- Occupation: Attorney, diplomat
- Known for: First Israeli Ambassador to the United Kingdom

Mordechai Eliash (Hebrew: מרדכי אליאש), also spelled Mordecai Eliash, (1892–March 11, 1950) was an Israeli attorney and diplomat. At a time when most Zionists were not observant Jews, and most observant Jews were not Zionists, he quickly became one of the leading lawyers in Mandatory Palestine after his arrival in 1919. Amidst a rise in intercommunal violence, Eliash represented the Jewish community to the Shaw Commission in 1929, the Western Wall Commission in 1930, and the Anglo-American Committee of Inquiry in 1946.

After the establishment of the State of Israel, he was briefly the country's first representative to the United Nations, before his service as the first Israeli ambassador to the United Kingdom from 1948 until his death in 1950.

== Biography ==
Mordechai Eliash was born in Uman, then part of the Russian Empire, in 1892. He received a religious Jewish education, before studying law and Oriental studies in Berlin and at Oxford University, where he received a B.Litt in 1919 with the thesis, The Risala of Shafi'i. In 1919, Eliash moved to Mandatory Palestine.

== Activities in Palestine ==
At a time when most Zionists were not observant Jews, and most observant Jews were not Zionists, he quickly became one of the leading lawyers in Mandatory Palestine. He served in the Jewish Agency's legal department and was a legal advisor to the Jewish National Council.

With the collapse of the Ottoman Empire and the formation of Mandatory Palestine under British administration, there was an increase in activity among of the Hebrew Courts of Arbitration, and the Hebrew Law Society was newly reestablished in Palestine. Eliash, along with other prominent Jewish lawyers in Palestine, such as Norman Bentwich and Gad Frumkin joined the society, which published two scholarly journals and founded two legal presses. By 1925, Eliash was vice president of the society and co-editor of its journal Ha-Mishpat ha-'Ivri.

As president of the Jewish Bar Association, Eliash was a leader of the pro-Hebrew language camp in mandatory courts. A debate within the Jewish legal profession was whether the Hebrew language was essential to the development of a legal system in the Yishuv that was Jewish in the historical and cultural sense. Eliash implored Jewish lawyers to use Hebrew in court correspondence and sought sanctions against Jewish lawyers who did not use Hebrew. He allowed exception in cases involving non-Jews or in private appearances before the judiciary. However, even the heads of the Histadrut, normally zealous about their use of Hebrew, did not follow the decree to use Hebrew in court. Eliash also protested the use by courts of Arabic or English in the courtroom, even if the case involved Jews.

=== 1929 Palestine riots ===
In the aftermath of the 1929 Palestine riots in Jerusalem, a British court had sentenced Simcha Hinkis, a Jewish policeman, and Joseph Urphali to death for allegedly killing an Arab family during the riots. Eliash represented Hinkis and Urphali at trial. Both men won appeals of their sentences in 1930 and had their punishments commuted to prison time.

Eliash served as a witness to the Shaw Commission established by the British Mandatory government in December 1929 to investigate the Arab riots against the Jews.

=== 1930 Western Wall Commission ===
Eliash was the chief counsel representing the Jewish community to the 1930 Wailing Wall Commission set up by the League of Nations to investigate competing Muslim and Jewish claims to the Western Wall. He worked alongside David Yellin, Meer Berlin, Kook, Sonnenfeld, and Blau to present the Jewish case, largely based on the arguments of Cyrus Adler, then with the American Jewish Committee and the Jewish Theological Seminary.

=== Anglo-American Committee of Inquiry ===
Eliash was the ranking member of a Jewish National Council delegation representing the Jews' position to the Anglo-American Committee of Inquiry. In oral arguments on March 14, 1946, he stressed to the committee that the Jews did not threaten Arab rights in Palestine, and it was the Jews who were subject to land and immigration restrictions.

== Diplomatic career ==
According to Arab newspaper Al Youm, on November 27, 1947, days before the United Nations General Assembly adopted the Partition Plan for Palestine, the ex-Mufti of Jerusalem Amin al-Husseini sent an emissary to Eliash, proposing secret direct talks between al-Husseini and the Jewish Agency. The Jews unanimously rejected entering into any talks with al-Husseini, who had provoked bloodshed against Jews and collaborated with Adolf Hitler during the Holocaust.

On the evening of May 14, 1948, the Israeli Declaration of Independence, Eliash was appointed as Israel's ambassador to the United Nations and was the first Israel envoy to speak for his government before the United Nations at Lake Success.

On February 14, 1949, Eliash was appointed as the first Israeli Ambassador to the United Kingdom. After Britain granted Israel de facto recognition, Eliash returned to London on April 5, 1949, to begin service as ambassador. The appointment of the religious Eliash to the post was regarded as a sensitive gesture, as the Jewish Agency had neglected relations with synagogues in the United Kingdom. According to scholar Natan Aridan, Eliash's regular appearances, including leading prayers, at the St John's Wood United Synagogue, an influential center of Anglo Jewry, was a key factor in improving ties with the Jewish community. Eliash also directed energy into cultivating ties with anti-Zionist Jews.

On October 31, 1949, Eliash gave an address over the airwaves of the BBC's first transmission in Hebrew.

== Personal ==
Eliash was stabbed in the throat and chest by two men, whom he believed to be Jews, while walking the streets of Jerusalem on January 30, 1936.

Eliash died of a heart attack in London during the Sabbath on March 11, 1950, at the age of 57. He was predeceased by his wife. He had a daughter, Rachel, and a son, Moshe. At Eliash's funeral in Jerusalem on March 15, 1950, he was eulogized by senior members of the Israeli government, including Israeli Foreign Minister and future Prime Minister Moshe Sharett and Chief Rabbi Benzion Uziel. Then-Prime Minister David Ben-Gurion interrupted his vacation to attend. Eliash was buried in Sanhedria Cemetery in Jerusalem.

== Legacy ==
The Jewish Telegraphic Agency described Eliash as "one of the men credited with helping bring about the establishment of the Jewish state." The moshav Kfar Mordechai in central Israel, established in 1950, is named for Eliash. In 1953, a stained glass window at St. John's Wood United Synagogue was dedicated in Eliash's memory. The synagogue also dedicated windows to first President of Israel Chaim Weizmann and Zionist leader Theodor Herzl.
