= Sarafand al-Kharab =

Sarafand al-Kharab صرفند الخراب
- Etymology: Kh Surafend; the ruin of Surafend
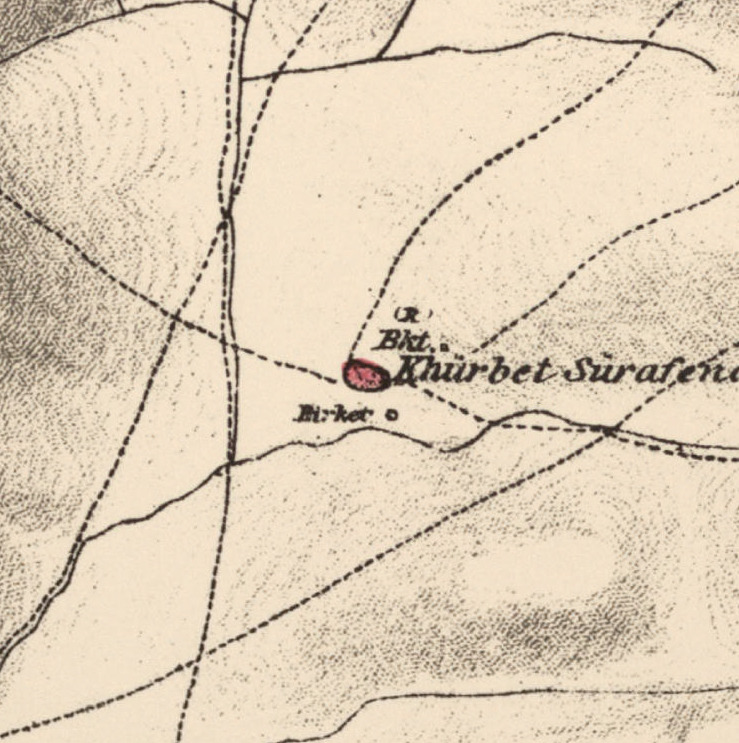
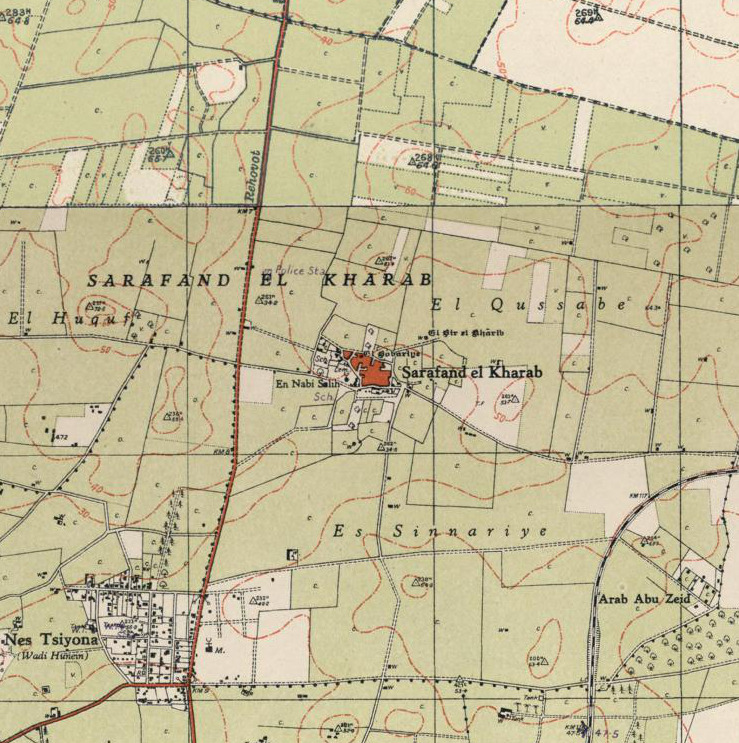
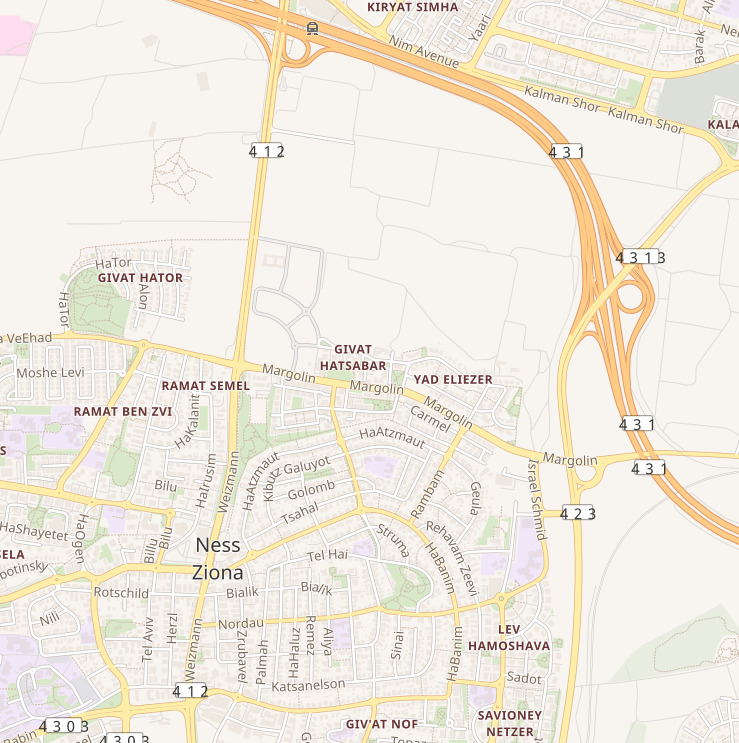
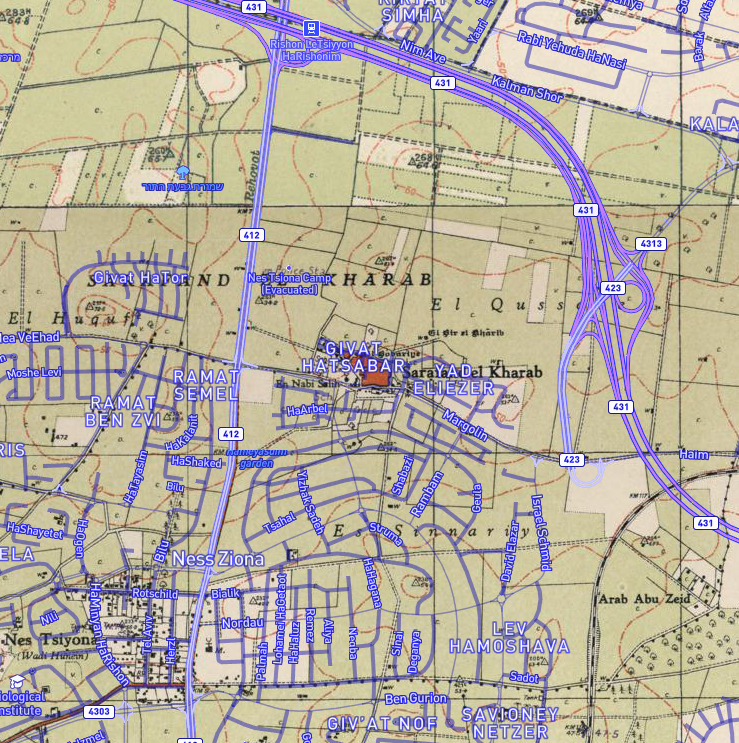
- 1870s map 1940s map modern map 1940s with modern overlay map A series of historical maps of the area around Sarafand al-Kharab (click the buttons)

- Location within Mandatory Palestine
- Coordinates: 31°56′11″N 34°48′20″E
- Palestine grid: 131/149
- Geopolitical entity: Mandatory Palestine
- Subdistrict: Ramle
- Date of depopulation: April 20, 1948

Area
  - Total: 5,503 dunams (5.503 km^{2}; 2.125 sq mi)
- —3,545 Arab-owned, 1,611 Jewish-owned, 347 public lands

Population (1945)
  - Total: 1,040
- Cause(s) of depopulation: Fear of being caught up in the fighting
- Current Localities: Ness Ziona

Sarafand al-Kharab (Arabic: صرفند الخراب) was a Palestinian Arab village in the Ramle Subdistrict, located 50 meters (160 ft) above sea level, 7 kilometers (4.3 mi) west of Ramla, in the area that is today northeast of Ness Ziona.

== Etymology ==
Sarafand or Sarafend (Ṣarafand / صرفند) is an Arabic rendition of the Aramaic place-name Ṣrifin. Al-Kharab means "the ruined, uninhabited".

== History ==
=== Early Muslim and Crusader periods ===
Umayyad and Abbasid pottery sherds from the 8th-10th centuries (part of the Early Muslim period) have been found here.

The Samaritan chronicle known as the Tolidah records the ancestry of the "Benē Marḥīb that descended from Benē Bakr b. Ur" from Sarafand.

An Arabic inscription on a slab of marble, formerly held in the private collection of Baron d'Ustinow, was found in Sarafand al-Kharab. Dating to the Fatimid period and ostensibly brought to the village from Ashkelon, it states: "The slave of amir al-mu'minin may Allah bless him and his pure ancestors, and his noble descendants. And he was then in charge of ... in the border stronghold of Ashqelon in the month of (?) of Rabi' II of the year 440." AH 440 corresponds to 1048/49 CE.

A vault dating from the Crusader period has been found in the village.

=== Ottoman period: 19th century ===
In 1838, Edward Robinson reported that there were two villages by the name of Sarafand in the area, one of which was inhabited by Muslims and the other ruined. Thus, it may be that Sarafand al-Kharab ("Sarafand of the ruins") acquired its name during this period. Both the Sarafand villages belonged to the District of Ibn Humar.

Dovid Grossman (scholar) believed that the village had been settled by Bedouins and Egyptians in the late 19th century. A more recent study, based on oral histories of former residents, indicated that Sarafand al-Kharab had been established by refugees from Abwein in the West Bank.

An Ottoman village list of about 1870 counted 22 houses and a population of 107 in Sarfend el Charab, though the population count included men only.

In 1882, the PEF's Survey of Western Palestine (SWP) noted the village on their maps as Khurbet Surafend, and described the archeological remains at the place as being "a tank or birkeh of rubble in cement, resembling those at Ramleh, here exists, with traces of other ruins."

Excavations revealed traces of Late Ottoman infant jar burials, commonly associated with nomads or itinerant workers of Egyptian origins.

=== British Mandate ===
In the 1922 census of Palestine conducted by the British Mandate authorities, Sarafand al-Kharab had a population of 385 Muslims, increasing in the 1931 census to 974; 938 Muslims, 33 Christians and 3 Jews, in a total of 206 residential houses.

Sarafand al-Kharab was one of a number of villages in the Lydda-Ramle district of Mandatory Palestine whose equine population was struck by an epidemic of African horse sickness in 1944, resulting in "stand-still" orders preventing the movement of horses outside of town between September and November 1944 and the deaths of 730 horses in the district.

In the 1945 statistics the village had a population of 1,040; 930 Muslims and 110 Christians, with a total of 5,503 dunams of land. (3,545 Arab-owned, 1,611 Jewish-owned, 347 public lands) In 1944-45, a total of 4,235 dunams were devoted to citrus and bananas and 499 dunams were allocated to cereals; 64 dunams were irrigated or used for orchards, while 33 dunams were classified as built-up, urban areas.

=== 1948, aftermath ===
By 8 April, Haganah reports mentioned that Palestinian women and children had started evacuating the village. News of the Deir Yassin massacre might have prompted further evacuation.

By September 1948, Sarafand al-Kharab was one village Israeli general Avner considered "suitable" for filling with newly Jewish immigrants, so-called olim.

In 1992 the village site was described as follows: "A major part of the village has been destroyed. Many houses, however, remain; no more than six of them, including the house of Muhammad Darwish, are occupied by Israeli families. Most of them have gable roofs and rectangular doors and windows. One house is comprised of two stories and has a slanted roof. The school is used by Israeli students. A pond and a pump house in the orchard of Mahmud Yusuf Darwish are still undamaged. Castor oil (Ricinus) plant and mulberry trees grow on the site. The cemetery is overgrown with cactus plants. The surrounding land are cultivated by Israelis."

== Gallery ==
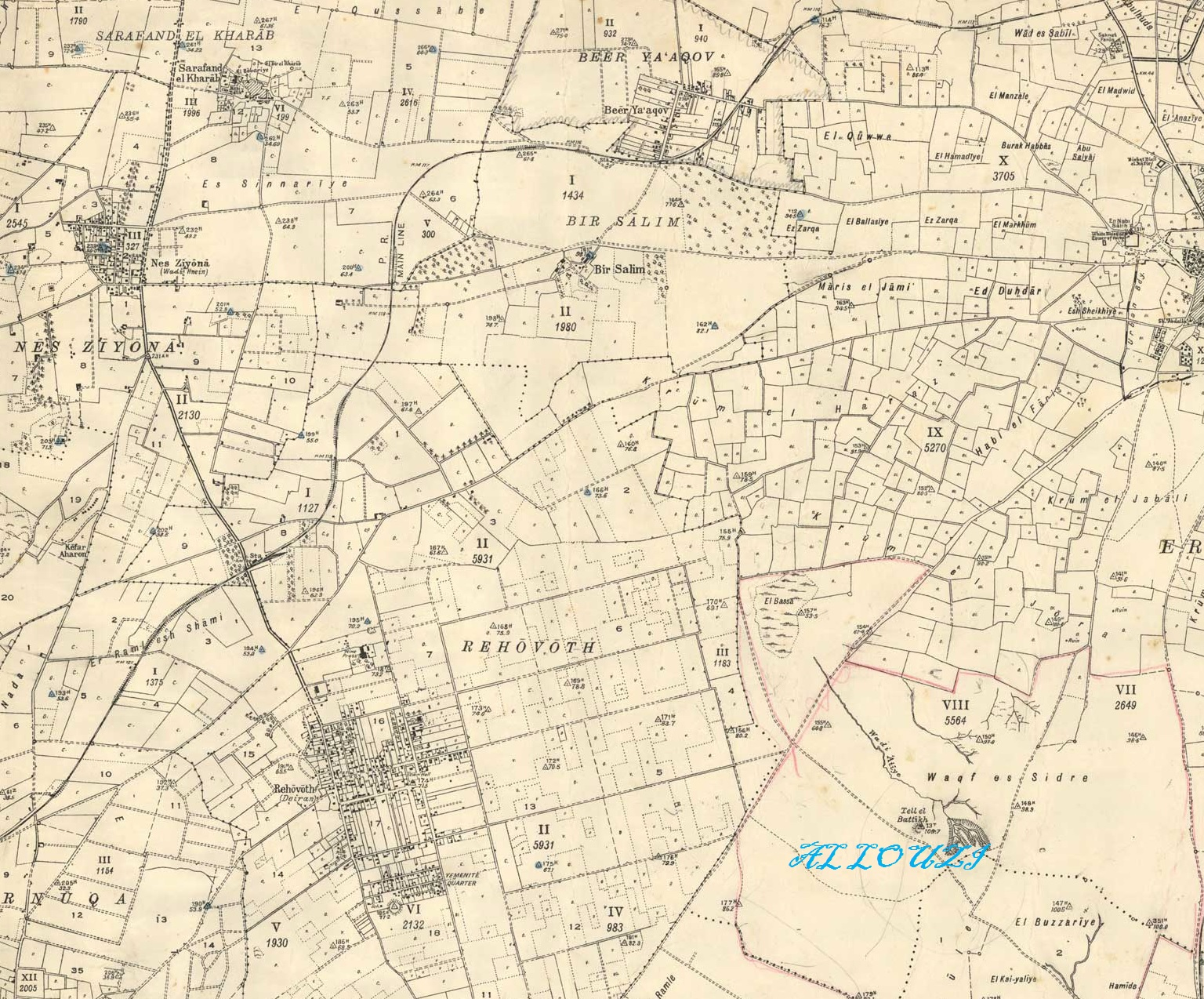
Sarafand al-Kharab area, 1930

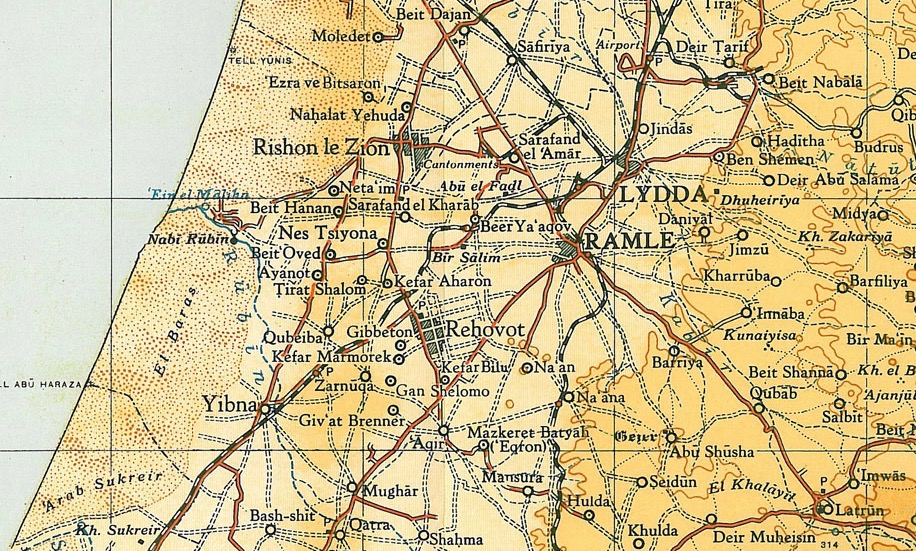
Sarafand el Kharab 1945 1:250,000

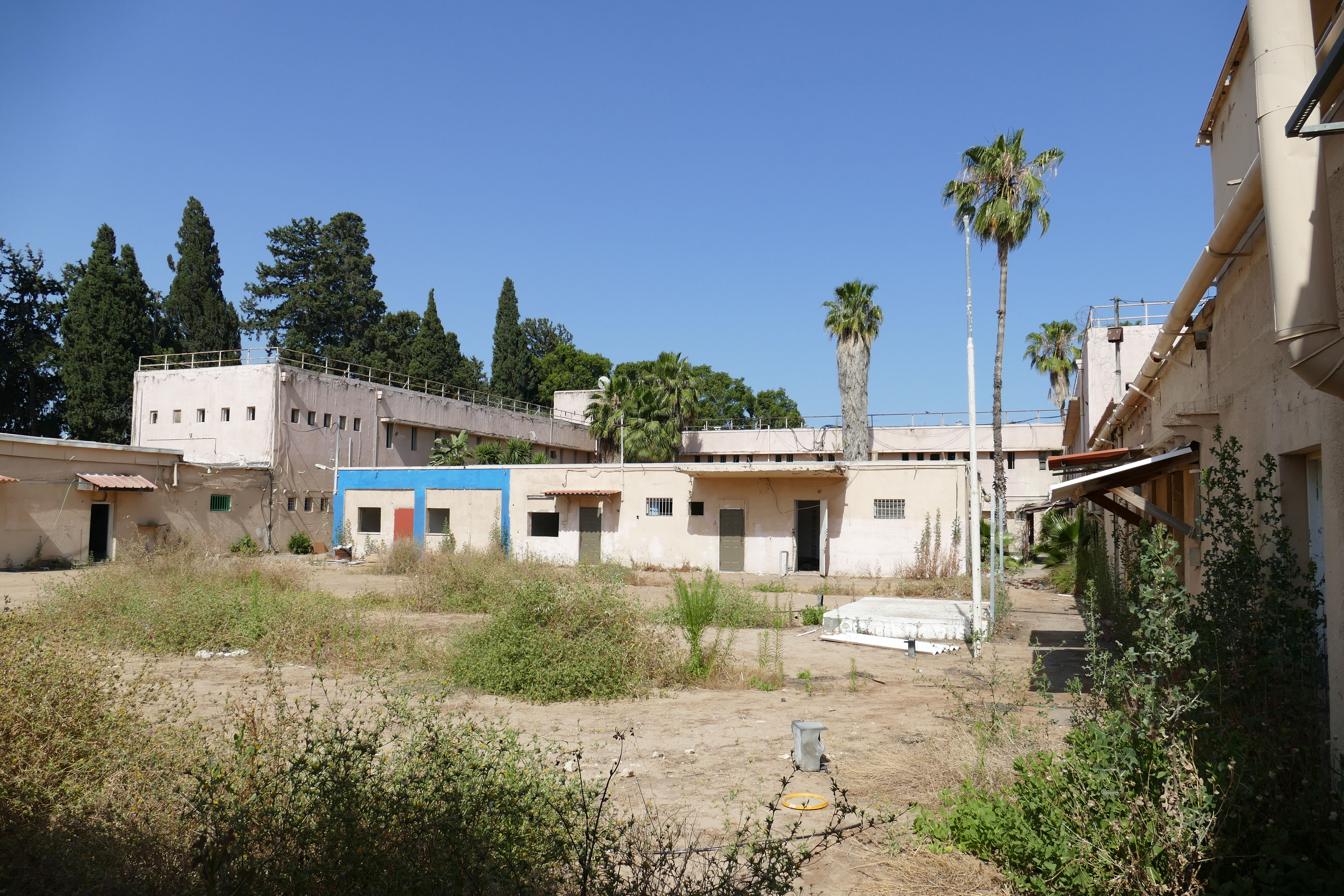
Former police station in Sarafand el Kharab, 2020

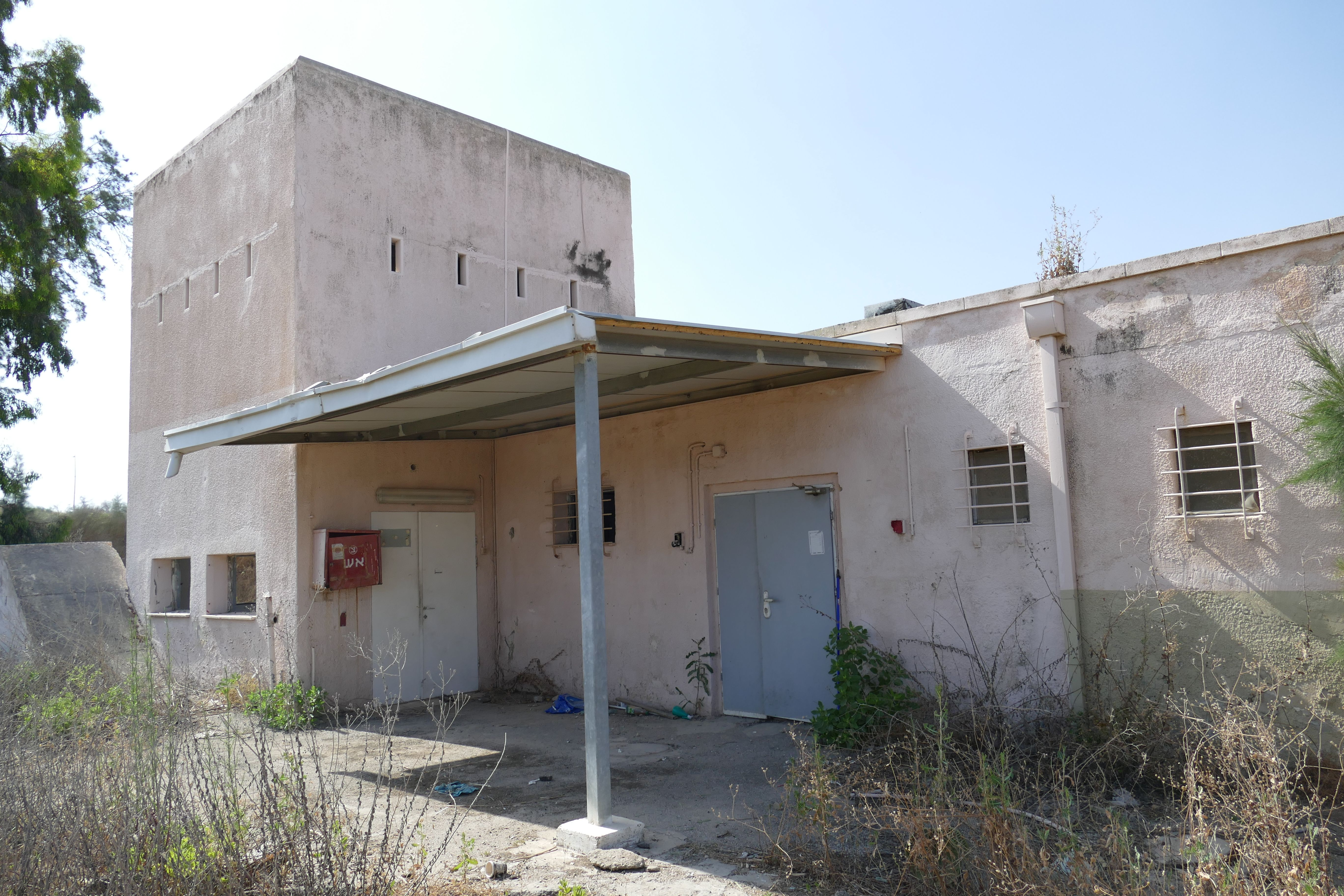
Former police station in Sarafand el Kharab, 2020

== Bibliography ==
- Barron, J.B., ed. (1923). Palestine: Report and General Abstracts of the Census of 1922. Government of Palestine.
- Conder, C.R.; Kitchener, H.H. (1882). The Survey of Western Palestine: Memoirs of the Topography, Orography, Hydrography, and Archaeology. Vol. 2. London: Committee of the Palestine Exploration Fund.
- Department of Statistics (1945). Village Statistics, April, 1945. Government of Palestine.
- El-Eini, Roza (2004). Mandated landscape: British imperial rule in Palestine, 1929-1948 (Illustrated ed.). Routledge. ISBN 978-1-1357-7240-6.
- Golan, Dor (2015-03-15). "Nes Ziyyona, Sarafand el-Kharab Final Report". Hadashot Arkheologiyot – Excavations and Surveys in Israel (127).
- Hadawi, S. (1970). Village Statistics of 1945: A Classification of Land and Area ownership in Palestine. Palestine Liberation Organization Research Center.
- Hartmann, M. (1883). "Die Ortschaftenliste des Liwa Jerusalem in dem türkischen Staatskalender für Syrien auf das Jahr 1288 der Flucht (1871)". Zeitschrift des Deutschen Palästina-Vereins. 6: 102–149.
- Khalidi, W. (1992). All That Remains: The Palestinian Villages Occupied and Depopulated by Israel in 1948. Washington D.C.: Institute for Palestine Studies. ISBN 0-88728-224-5.
- Mills, E., ed. (1932). Census of Palestine 1931. Population of Villages, Towns and Administrative Areas. Jerusalem: Government of Palestine.
- Morris, B. (2004). The Birth of the Palestinian Refugee Problem Revisited. Cambridge University Press. ISBN 978-0-521-00967-6.
- Palmer, E.H. (1881). The Survey of Western Palestine: Arabic and English Name Lists Collected During the Survey by Lieutenants Conder and Kitchener, R. E. Transliterated and Explained by E.H. Palmer. Committee of the Palestine Exploration Fund.
- Pringle, D. (1997). Secular buildings in the Crusader Kingdom of Jerusalem: an archaeological Gazetter. Cambridge University Press. ISBN 0521-46010-7.
- Robinson, E.; Smith, E. (1841). Biblical Researches in Palestine, Mount Sinai and Arabia Petraea: A Journal of Travels in the year 1838. Vol. 3. Boston: Crocker & Brewster.
- Sharon, M. (1997). Corpus Inscriptionum Arabicarum Palaestinae, A. Vol. 1. BRILL. ISBN 90-04-10833-5.
- Socin, A. (1879). "Alphabetisches Verzeichniss von Ortschaften des Paschalik Jerusalem". Zeitschrift des Deutschen Palästina-Vereins. 2: 135–163.
