= Ness Ziona =

City in Central District, Israel

Ness Ziona נֵס צִיּוֹנָה
- City (from 1992)
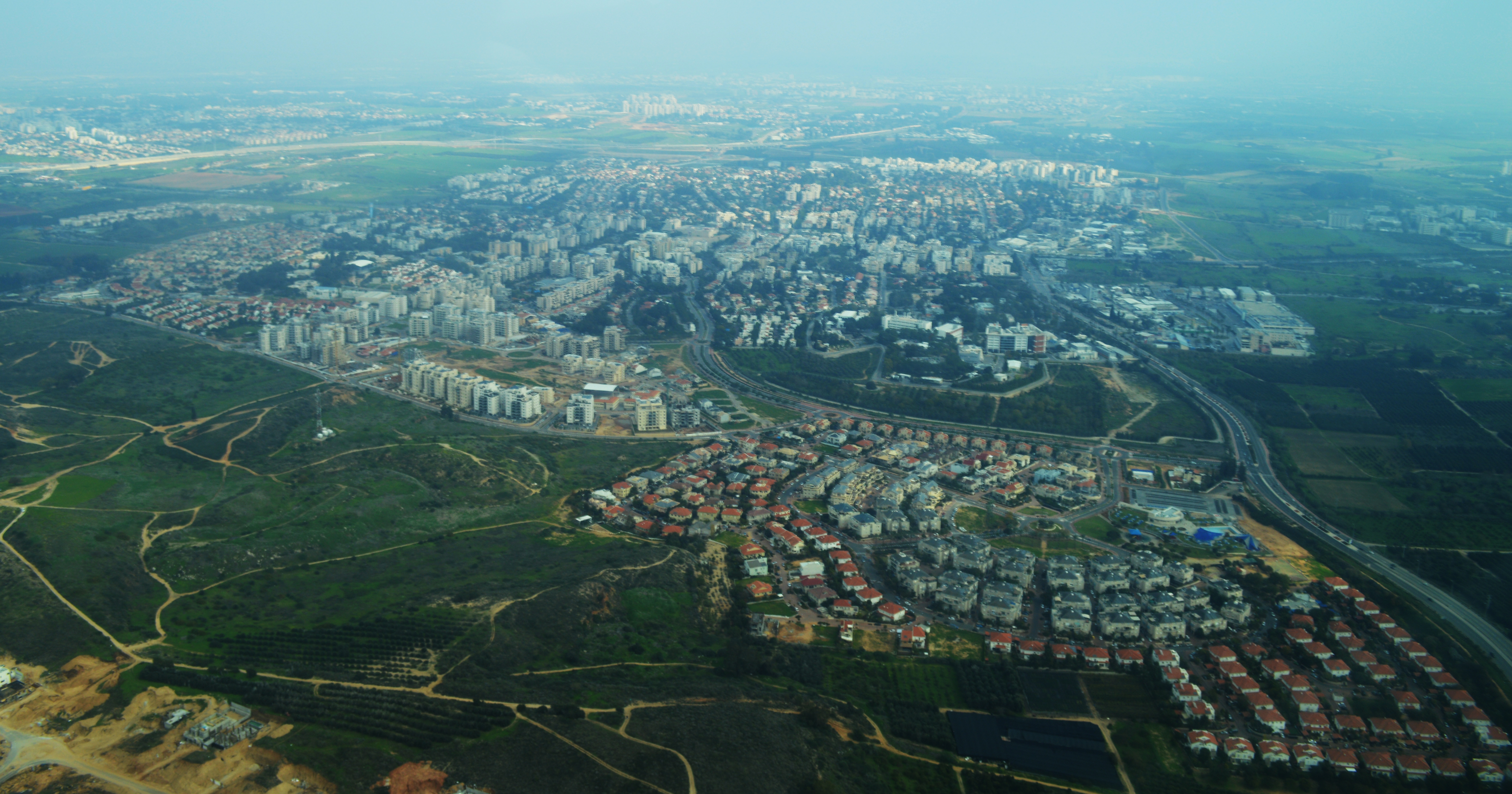

- Emblem of Ness Ziona

- Location within Central Israel Location within Israel
- Coordinates: 31°56′N 34°48′E
- Country: Israel
- District: Central
- Subdistrict: Rehovot
- Natural Region: Rishon LeZion
- Founded: 1883; 143 years ago

Government
  - Mayor: Shmuel Boxer

Area
  - Total: 15,579 dunams (15.579 km^{2}; 6.015 sq mi)

Population (2024)
  - Total: 47,267
  - Density: 3,034.0/km^{2} (7,858.1/sq mi)

Ethnicity
  - Jews and others: 99.9%
  - Arabs: 0.1%

Ness Ziona (Hebrew: נֵס צִיּוֹנָה, Nes Tziyona) is a city in Central District, Israel. In 2024 it had a population of 47,267, and its jurisdiction was 15,579 dunams (15.579 km^{2} [6.015 sq mi]). Ness Ziona is located about 15km south-west of Tel Aviv.

== Identification ==
Lying within Ness Ziona's city bounds is the ruin of the Arab village of Sarafand al-Kharab, which was depopulated in 1948. Some scholars believe that this is the site that the medieval Jewish traveller Ishtori Haparchi identified as the Talmudic Tzrifin, but other scholars believe Haparchi was referring to Sarafand al-Amar, 5 km distant. However, neither site has revealed archaeological remains from Talmudic times. On the basis of excavations at Sarafand al-Kharab, it is believed to have been founded no earlier than the late Byzantine period.

== History ==
=== Wadi Chanin/Nahalat Reuben ===
==== German farm (1878–1883) ====
In 1878, the German Templer Gustav Reisler purchased lands in Wadi Hunayn, planted an orchard, and lived there with his family. The name "Wadi-Chanin", with its German orthography, became the standard Western name for the place for several decades to come. After losing his wife and children to malaria, Reisler returned to Europe. He travelled to Odessa in 1882 and met Reuben Lehrer, born Patchornik (1832–1917), a religiously observant Russian Jew with Zionist ideals, who had his own farmland there. Reisler traded his parcel of land in Palestine for Lehrer's land in Russia.

==== Jewish settlement (1883) ====
Reuben Lehrer made aliyah (emigrated to Palestine) with his eldest son Moshe in 1883, bringing over his wife and another four of his children the following year.

Lehrer placed advertisements near Jaffa port asking others to join him offering plots in his land for a small amount of money. The pioneers that arrived established a settlement named Tel Aviv (the city of Tel Aviv did not yet exist), although the area was still known as Wadi Chanin, from its Arabic name, Wadi Hunayn.

The settlement (colony, moshava) was known for a while as Wadi Chanin after the local Arab village, and as Nahalat Reuben (lit. "Reuben's Estate") after Reuben Lehrer.

=== Ness Ziona (1891) ===
In 1891, Michael Halperin bought more land in the wadi. He gathered a group of people on the "Hill of Love", where he arrived with the "Mahane Yehuda" mounted guards company he had founded, and unfurled a blue and white flag emblazoned with the Star of David and the words "Ness Ziona" ('Banner toward Zion' or 'Miracle of Zion') written in gold. The name is based on a verse from the Book of Jeremiah, Jeremiah 4:6: "Raise a standard toward Zion...". This flag was taken by Halperin to the First Zionist Congress seven years later, where it became the model for the official flag adopted by the nascent movement.

=== United Jewish village ===
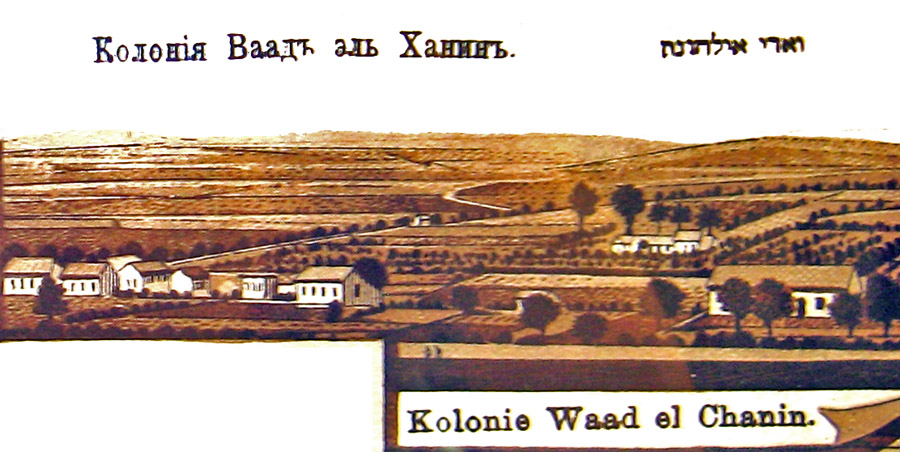
"Waad el Chanin" colony, museum display adaptation of early 20th-century postcard

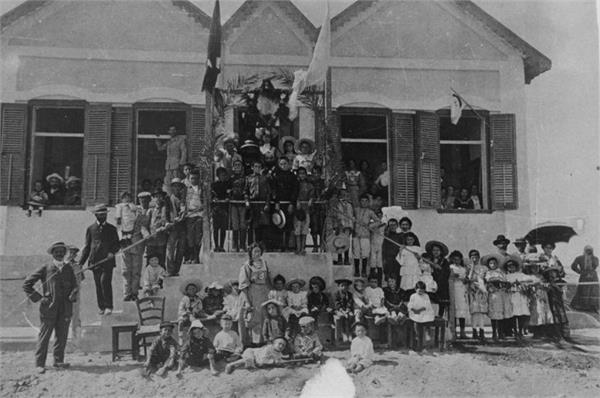
Ness Ziona, the first communal building, 1907

In 1905, the "Geula" organisation bought the piece of land separating the older Wadi Chanin/Nahalat Reuben and the newer Ness Ziona, allowing the two Jewish settlements to unite into one larger village.

=== United Jewish–Arab village ===
In 1926, a new Arab village, Wadi Hunayn, developed across the Jaffa–Jerusalem road from a watermelon farm established there by the Abu Jaber clan from Sarafand el-Kharab, and became part of the same administrative unit as Ness Ziona.

Until the 1948 Arab–Israeli War, it was the only mixed Arab–Jewish village in Mandatory Palestine. The coexistence was, on the whole, a peaceful one.

=== British Mandate ===
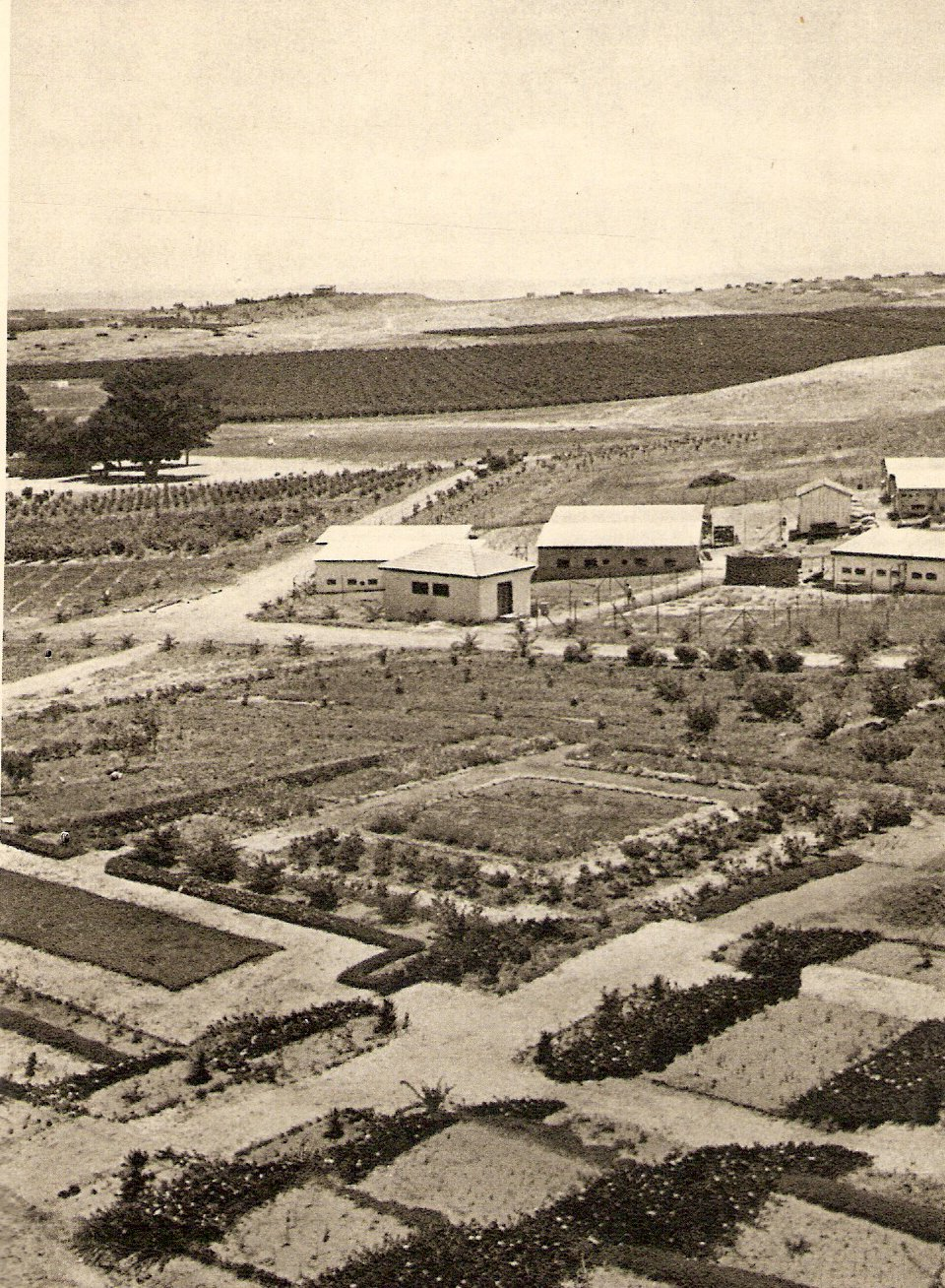
Ness Ziona, 1934

According to a census conducted in 1922 by the British Mandate authorities, Ness Ziona had a population of 319 Jews. By the 1931 census, it had increased to 1,013 inhabitants in 221 houses. In 1921 a pump and a system of water pipes were installed. In 1924 the British Army contracted the Israel Electric Company for wired electric power. The contract allowed the Electric Company to extend the grid beyond the original geographical limits that had been projected by the concession it was given. The high-tension line that exceeded the limits of the original concession ran along some major towns and agricultural settlements, offering extended connections to the Jewish settlements of Rishon Le-Zion, Nes-Ziona and Rehovot (in spite of their proximity to the high-tension line, the Arab towns of Ramleh and Lydda remained unconnected).

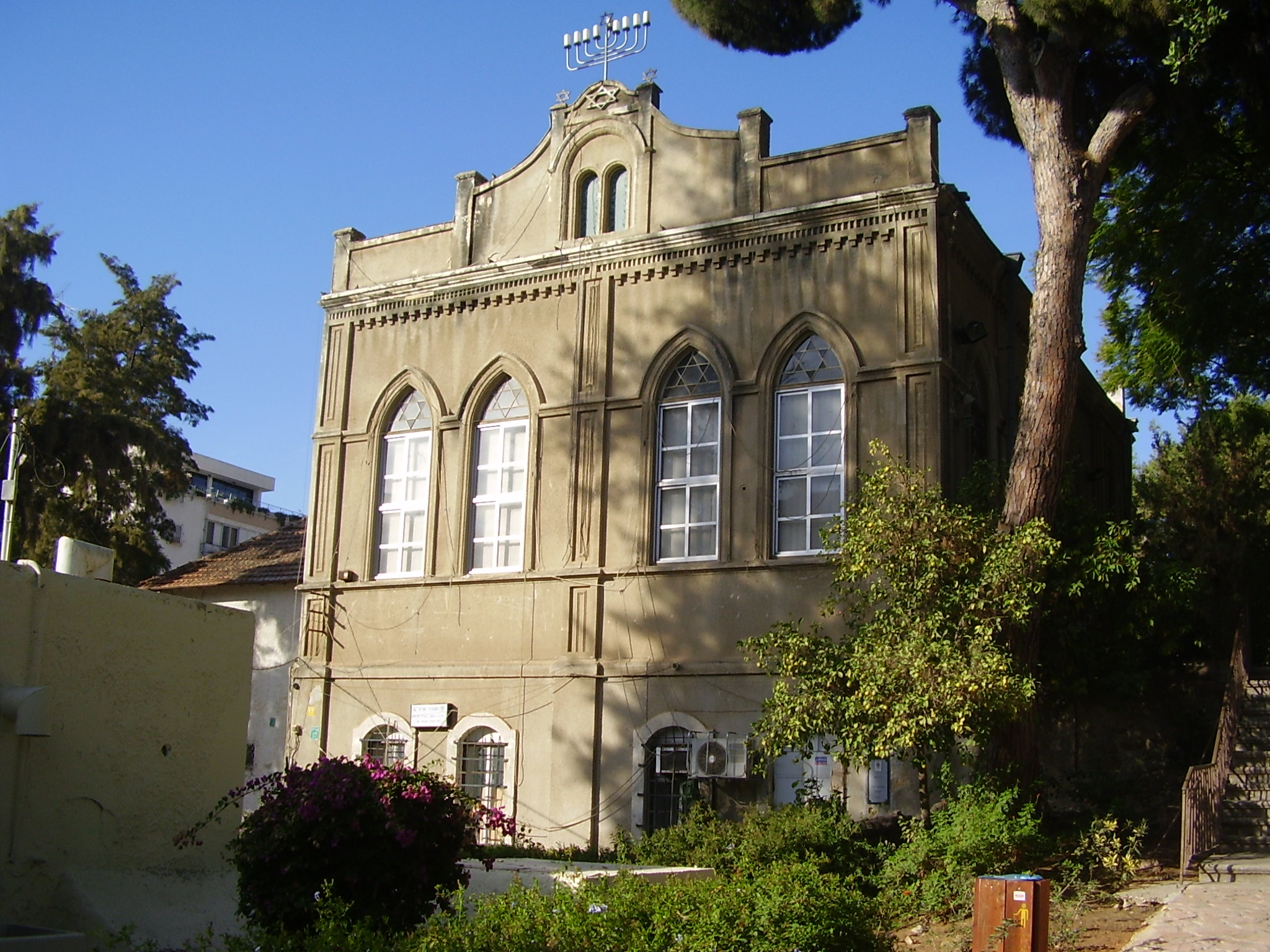
Ness Ziona Great Synagogue

The Great Synagogue of Ness Ziona was built in the 1920s, during the period of the Third Aliyah.

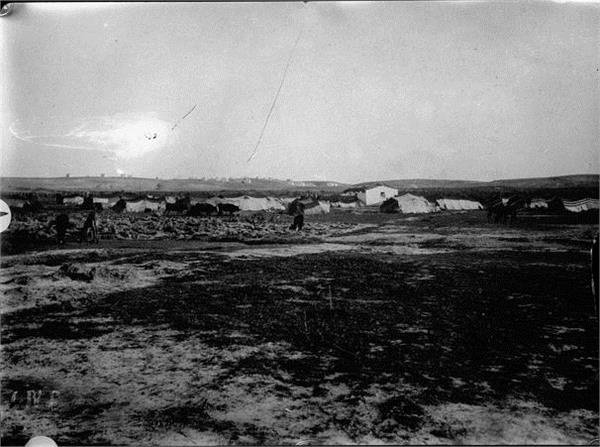
Bedouin encampment at Ness Ziona, 1934

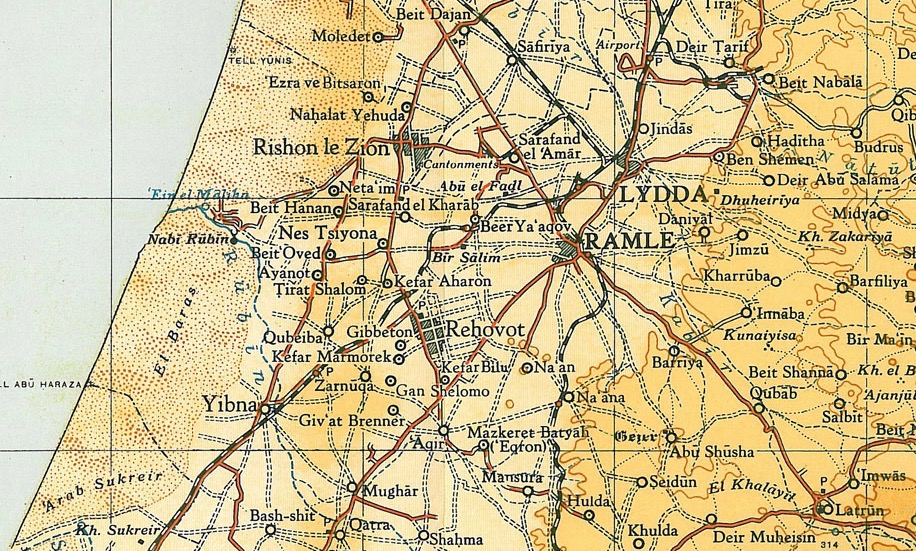
Ness Ziona (Nes Tisyona) on 1945 1:250,000 map

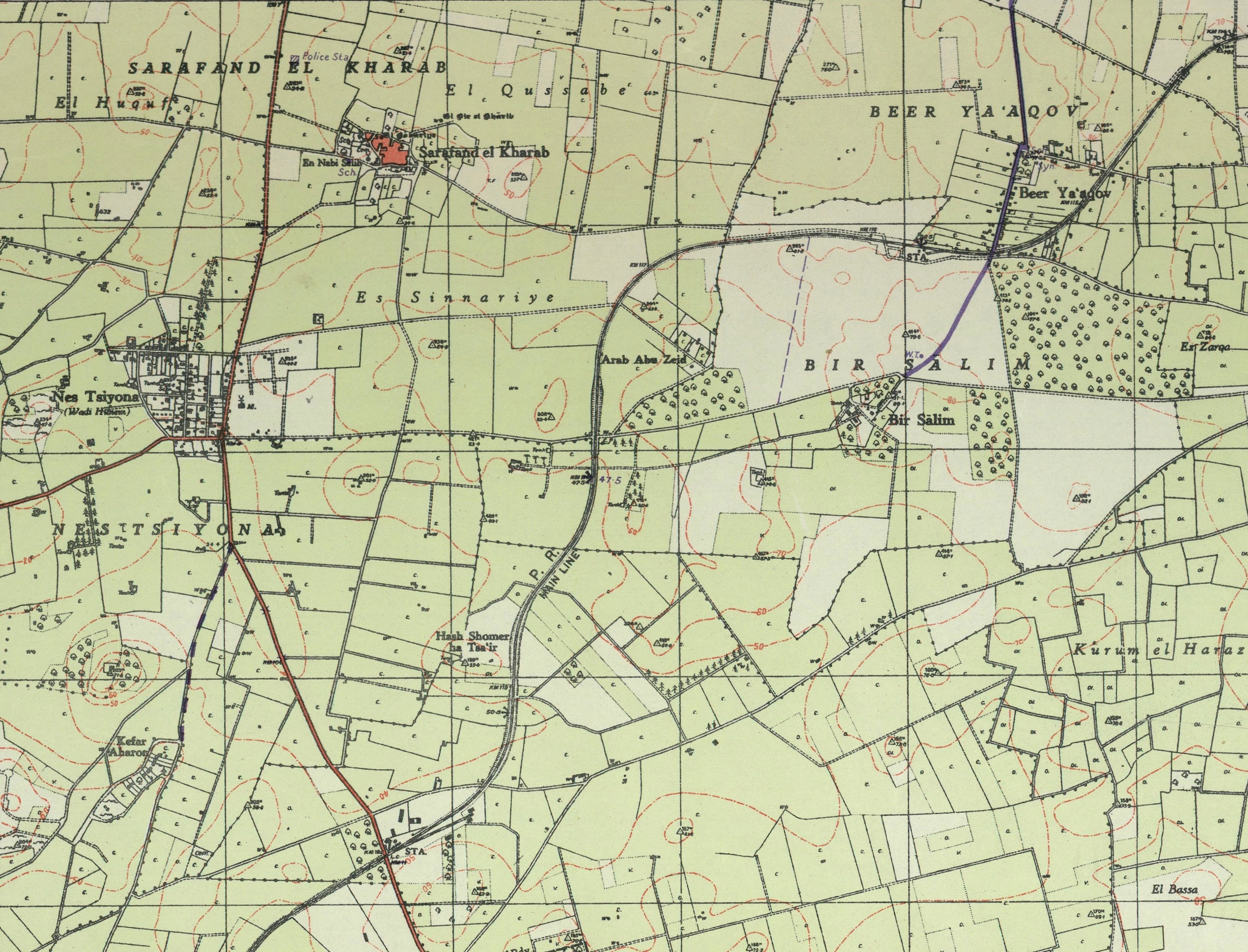
Ness Ziona (Nes Tsiyona) on 1948 1:20,000 map

=== Givat Michael ===
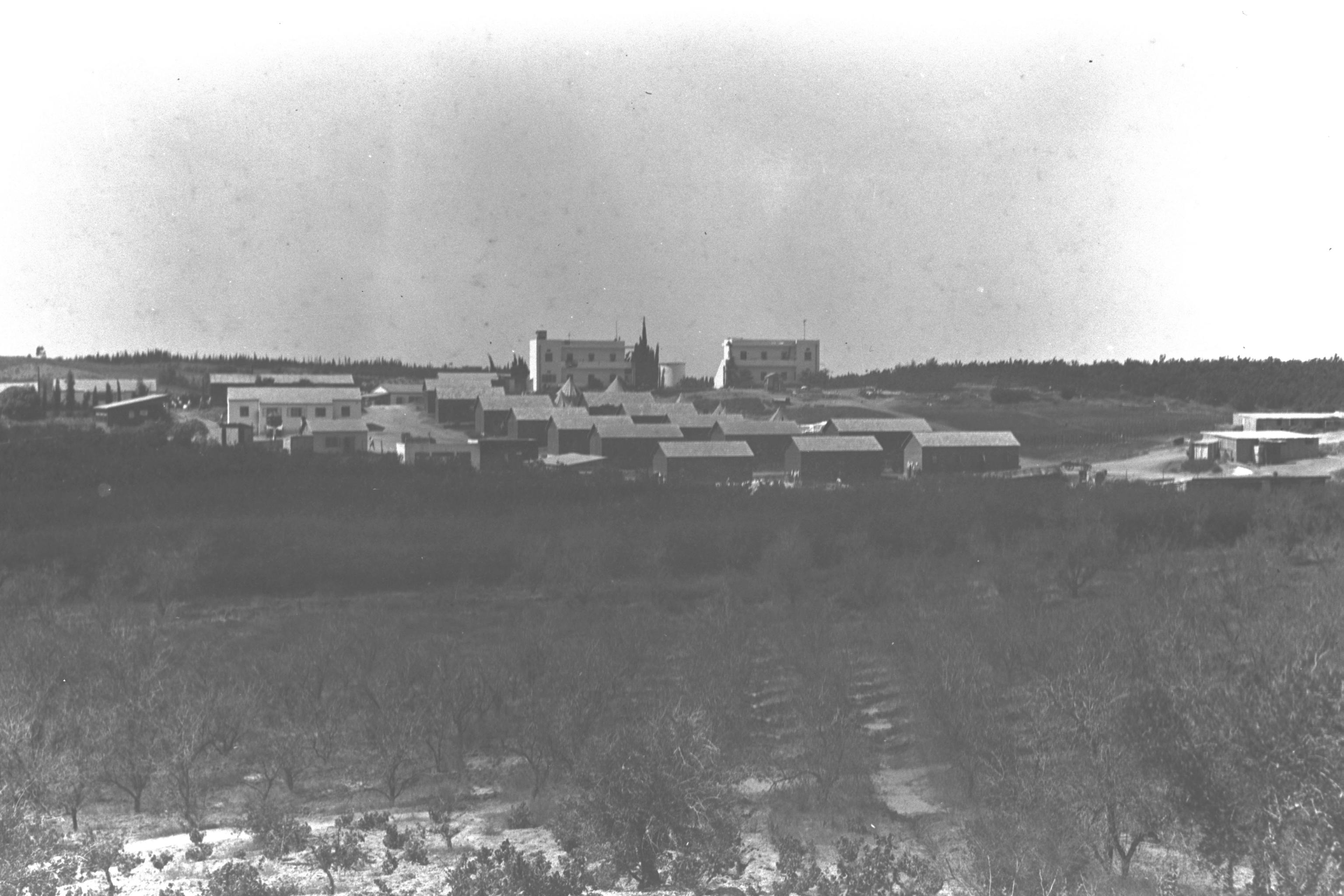
Givat Michael. Zoltan Kluger, Oct. 1939.

In 1935, a temporary workers' camp named Givat Michael after Michael Halperin, was established near Ness Ziona. It was meant as a training camp for new settlement groups ("gar'in"), two of which went on to establish the kibbutzim of Gal On and Mesilot.

=== Arab attacks ===
Ness Ziona was attacked by Arab forces during the 1936–1939 Arab Revolt, and the 1948 Arab–Israeli War. The outlying villages of Kfar Aharon and Tirat Shalom (now part of Ness Ziona) frequently exchanged fire with the Arab villages al-Qubayba and Zarnuqa (now western Rehovot). Most of Ness Ziona's youth joined the Haganah to fight off these threats. On May 15, 1948, Sarafand al-Kharab was evacuated of Arab inhabitants, and on May 19, al-Qubayba and Zarnuqa were conquered by the Givati Brigade. Much of the territory abandoned by the fleeing Arab residents of nearby villages was added to Ness Ziona, increasing its size from 8 to 15.3 square kilometres (3.1 to 5.9 sq mi) immediately after the war.

=== After the establishment of the state ===
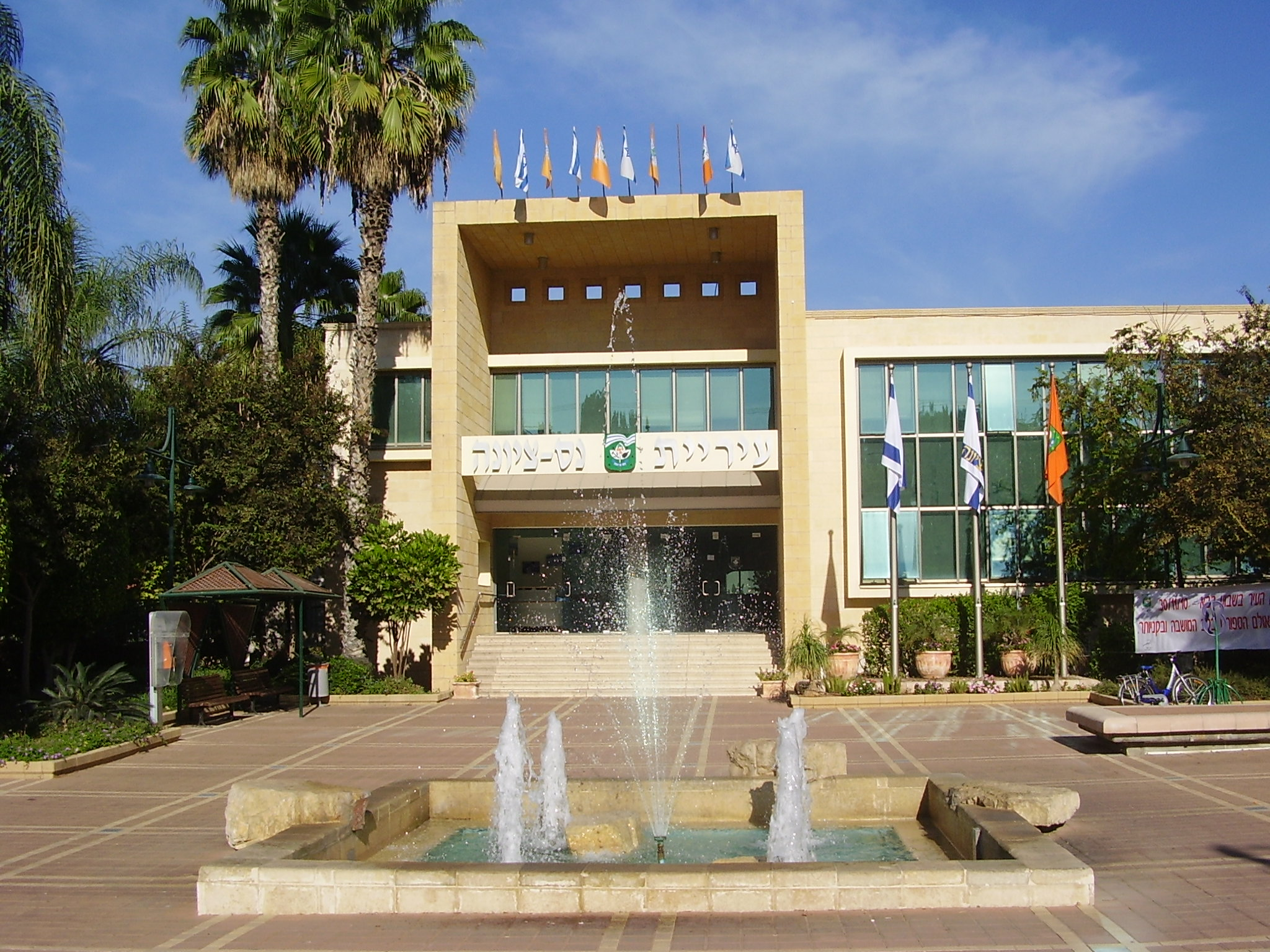
Ness Ziona City Hall

During the war, Ness Ziona's population almost tripled to become 4,446 (according to an October 23, 1949 survey), and until 1950 the local council absorbed 9,000 olim, most of whom were housed in ma'abarot (provisional housing camps). In 1952, a new industrial zone was approved for the town on an area of 70 dunams. In 1955, a second industrial zone was approved.

== Geography ==
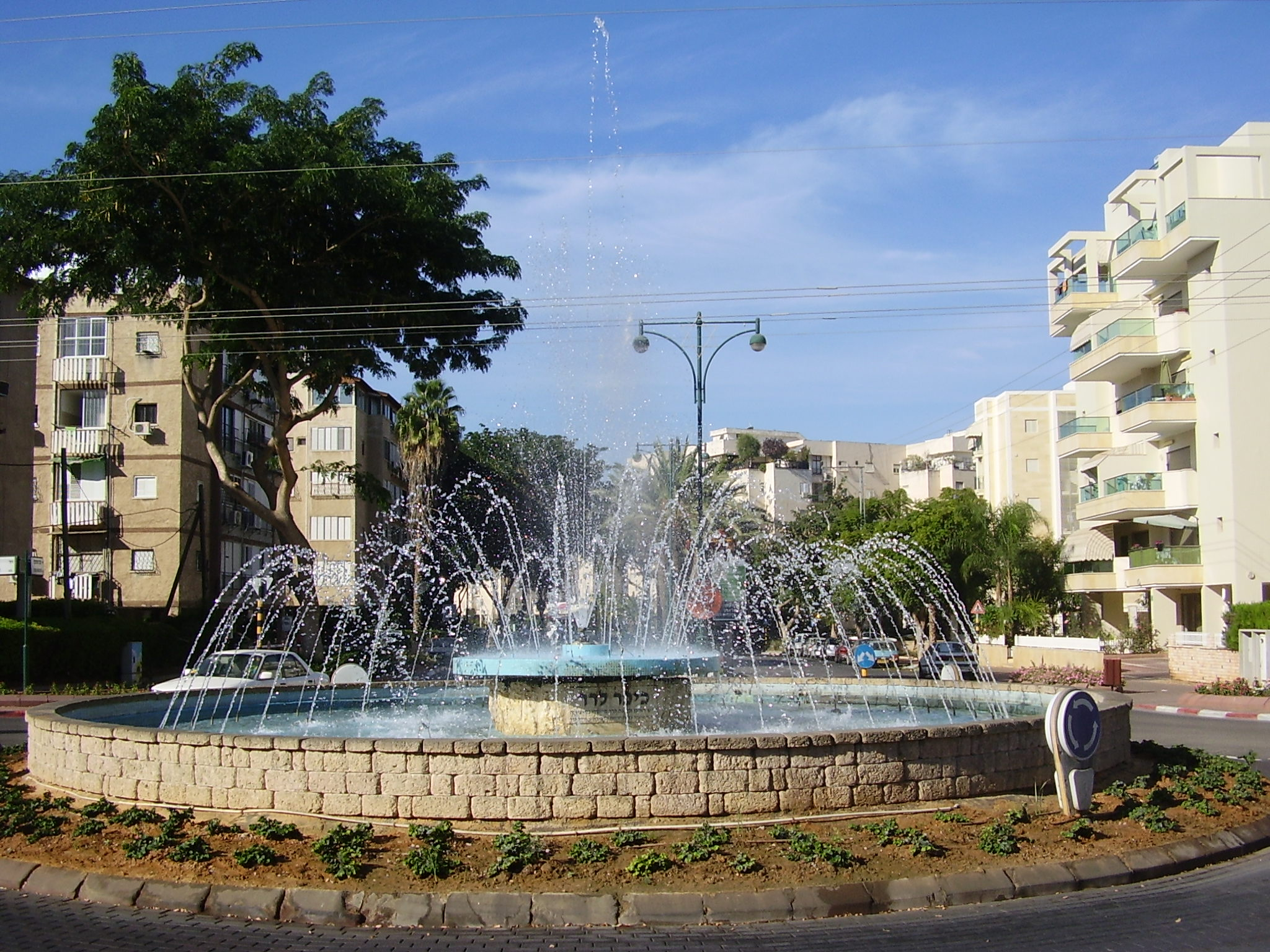
Lehrer Square HaMa’apilim Avenue

Ness Ziona is located on the Israeli coastal plain approximately 10 km (6 mi) inland of the Mediterranean Sea, to the south of Tel Aviv. The city is bordered to the north by Rishon LeZion, to the east by Be'er Ya'akov, and to the south by Rehovot. Beit Hanan, Beit Oved, Ayanot youth village and Kibbutz Netzer Sereni also border the city. The city has been designed to have a rural character due to urban planning that bans the construction of buildings higher than eight stories. Property values have risen by 30 percent in recent years. Ness Ziona is located in the Shfela region to the south of Tel Aviv.

=== Neighborhoods ===
Ness Ziona is composed of a central core and villages that came under its municipal jurisdiction over time. The city also has two industrial zones and a high-tech park, Kiryat Weizmann.

== Demographics ==
Historical population
Year	Pop.	±%
1972	12,700	—
1983	15,000	+18.1%
1995	22,000	+46.7%
2008	36,100	+64.1%
2022	47,620	+31.9%
2024	47,268	−0.7%

According to the Israeli Central Bureau of Statistics (CBS), in 2005 the ethnic makeup of the city was 99.6% Jewish and other non-Arabs. At the end of 2004 there were 612 immigrants (2.2%), although this rose sharply to 7.8% in 2005. The city also receives significant internal migration, and is popular among Tel Aviv residents seeking to leave the city.

In 2005 there were 14,400 males and 14,900 females. 31.8% of the population was 19 years of age or younger, 15.2% between 20 and 29, 21% between 30 and 44, 19.1% from 45 to 59, 3.1% from 60 to 64, and 9.7% 65 years of age or older. The population growth rate in 2006 was 5.8%.

In 2005, there were 11,830 salaried workers and 984 self-employed. The mean monthly wage for a salaried worker was NIS 7,597, a 9.2% increase over 2000. Salaried males had a mean monthly wage of NIS 9,802 (an 8.4% increase) versus NIS 5,595 for females (a 14% increase). The mean income for the self-employed was 7,064. There were 290 people receiving unemployment benefits and 986 receiving an income guarantee (welfare).

== Economy ==
Ness Ziona is home to the Israel Institute for Biological Research (IIBR), a secret government defence research institute working in chemical and biological research with 350 employees, and Zenith Solar, a solar energy company. The Kiryat Weizmann Science Park is a magnet for many Israeli start-ups, among them Indigo Digital Press, which was acquired by Hewlett-Packard in 2002 and manufactures high-end digital printing presses.

== Education ==
=== Schools ===
Until 1961 there was only elementary school in Ness Ziona. In 1961 (שנת הלימודים תשכ"ב), Ben Gurion High school was opened.

There are 20 schools in Ness Ziona:

- Elementary: "Rishonim", "Eshkol", "Savionim", "Ben Zvi", "Hadar", "Shaked", "Nizanim", "Argaman", "Lev HaMoshava", "Irus", "Sadot" and "Shibolim".
- Religious: "Reut", "Habad".
- High Schools: "Golda", "Ben Gurion", "Eliezer Ben Yehuda", "Park HaMada".
- Special Education: "HaTomer", "Dklaim".

=== Youth Organizations ===
The following youth organizations have chapters in Ness Ziona:

- Bnei Akiva
- HaNoar HaOved VeHaLomed
- Maccabi youth movement
- Hebrew Scouts Movement in Israel
- Krembo Wings
- Moadonchik
- Israel Gay Youth

== Sports ==
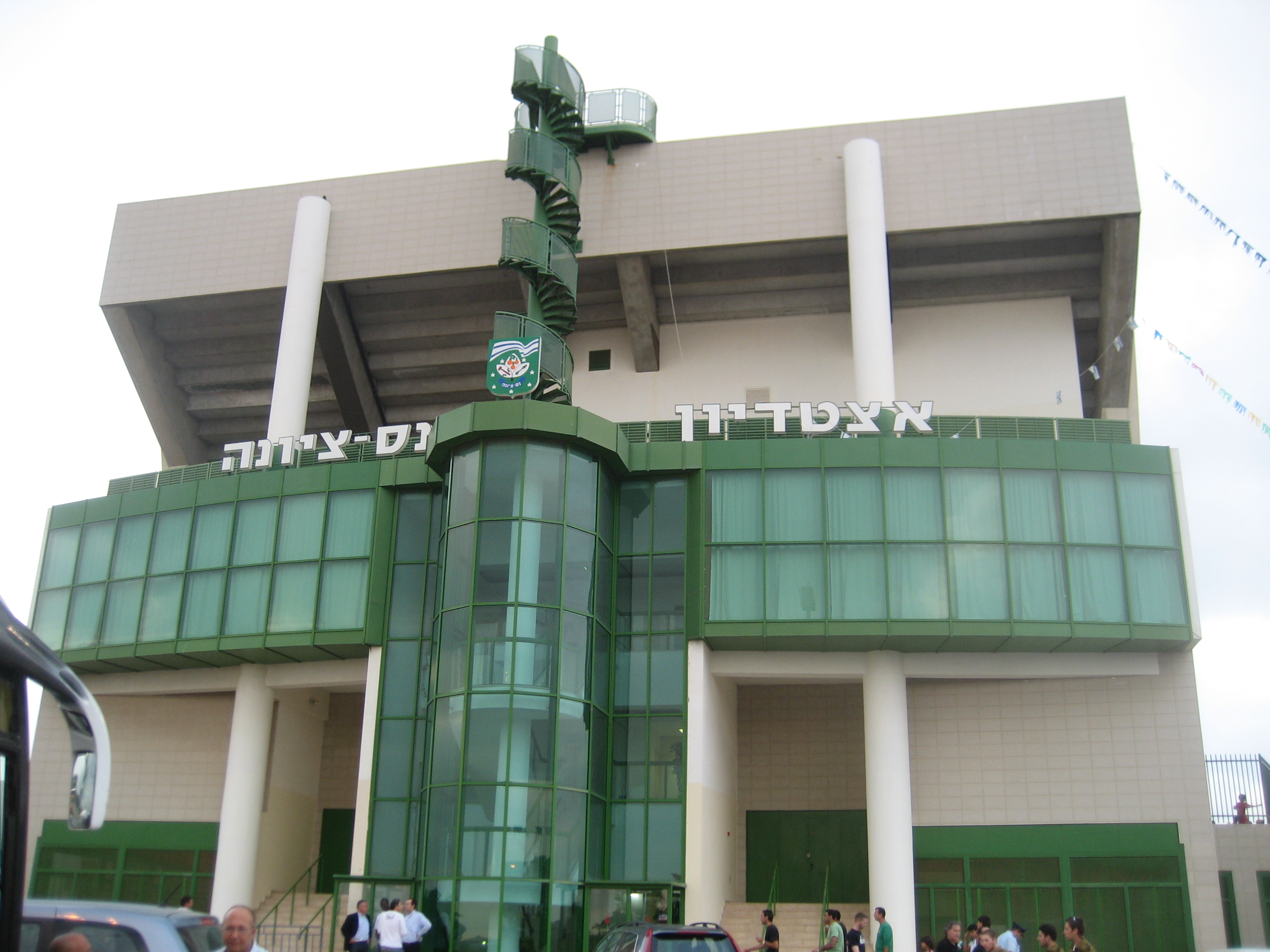
Ness Ziona Stadium

The city has been represented in the top division of Israeli football by two different clubs; Maccabi Ness Ziona competed in the top flight in the first post-independence season. However, they lost all 24 games, and were relegated. A new club, Sektzia Ness Ziona was formed in 1956 and reached the top flight in 1966. However, they were relegated after only one season. After folding, they reformed as Ironi Ness Ziona in 2001, and since then have reverted to their former name and reached Liga Leumit, the second tier. The club plays at the Ness Ziona Stadium.

The town is also home to a basketball team, Ironi Nes Ziona B.C., playing in the national premier league.

== Transportation ==
Ness Ziona has two main roads – Highway 42 to the west, and Road 412 (Weizmann Street), which goes through the city center and connects to Rishon LeZion and Rehovot.

Ness Ziona is also served by 5 bus lines operated by Egged (company).

== Voting Patterns ==
In the 2022 election, 62 percent of voters in Ness Ziona voted for the parties of the center-left coalition led by Yair Lapid, while 35 percent voted for the parties of the right-wing coalition led by Benjamin Netanyahu and 0.2 percent voted for the Arab parties.

In the 2026 election, 64 percent of voters in Ness Ziona voted for the parties of the center-left coalition led by Gadi Eisenkot, while 30 percent voted for the parties of the right-wing coalition led by Benjamin Netanyahu and 0.2 percent voted for the Arab parties. An additional 4 percent voted for the Reservists, and 1.7 percent voted for Amcha Yisrael. Voter turnout increased 11 percent from the 2022 election.

== Notable people ==
- Avigdor Kahalani (born 1944), soldier and politician
- Avraham Katz (1931–1986), politician
- Tamir Nabaty (born 1991), chess Grandmaster
- Ya'akov Shahar (born 1941), owner of Maccabi Haifa
- Shimi Tavori (born 1953), singer
- Pini Zahavi (born 1955), football agent
- Dror Zeigerman (born 1948), politician and diplomat
- Misha Zilberman (born 1989), Olympic badminton player

== Twin towns – sister cities ==
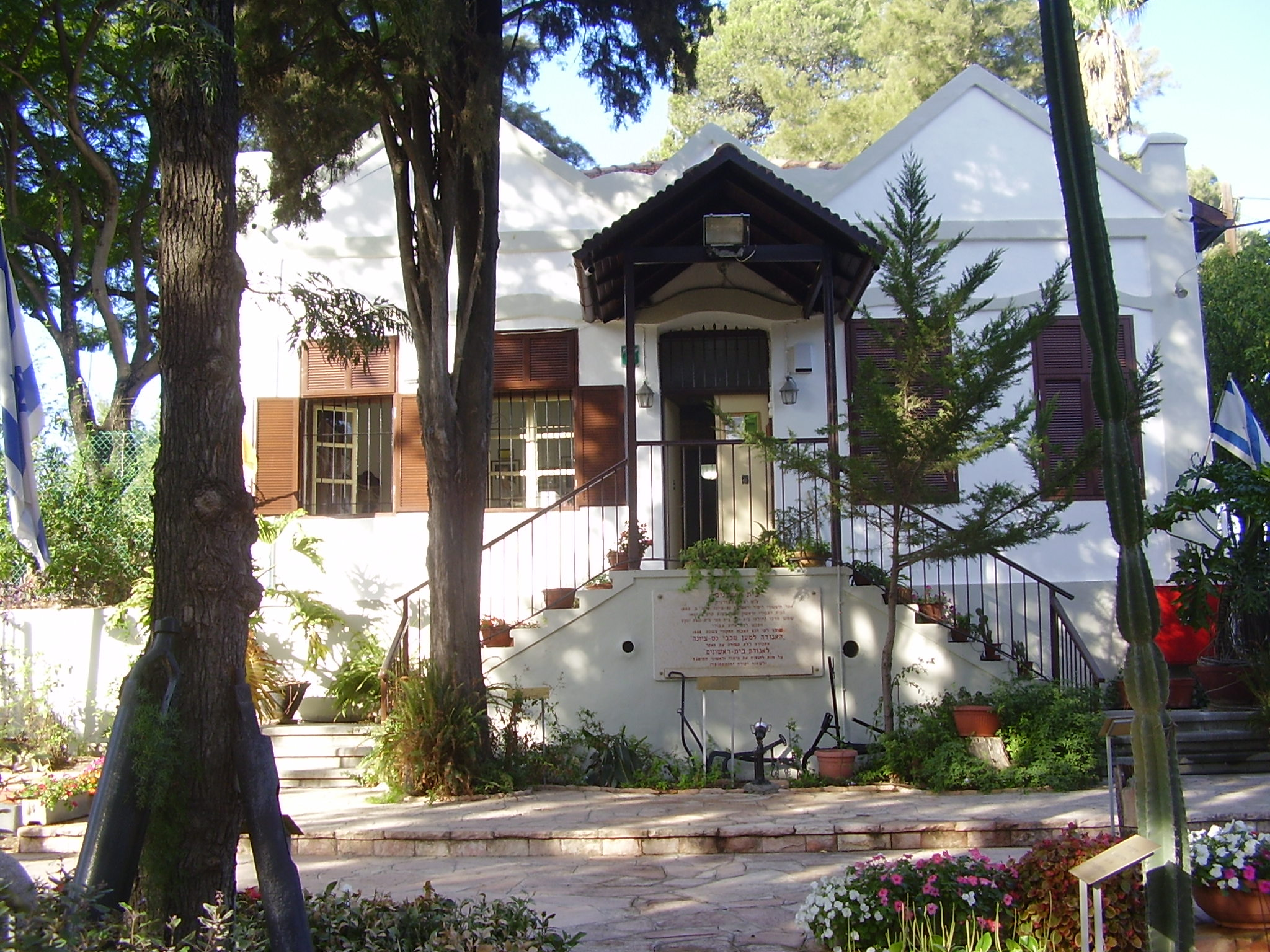
Founders' house museum, Ness Ziona

Ness Ziona is twinned with:

- Freiberg, Germany
- Le Grand-Quevilly, France
- Solingen, Germany
- Qingdao, China
- Piotrków Trybunalski, Poland

== See also ==
- Population groups in Israel
- Nahala (disambiguation), Hebrew word for heritage or estate widely used for toponyms in Israel
