= Wellington East =

Wellington East may mean:

- Wellington East (Canadian electoral district), was a provincial electoral district in the province of Ontario, Canada
- Wellington East (New Zealand electorate), was a parliamentary electorate in the eastern suburbs of Wellington, New Zealand from 1887 to 1890 and from 1905 to 1946
- 9th (Wellington East Coast) Mounted Rifles, in New Zealand, was formed on 17 March 1911
- Wellington East Girls' College, on the lower slopes of Mount Victoria, in New Zealand
- Wellington East, South Australia, locality on the left bank of the lower reaches of the Murray River in Australia
