= Queen Alexandra's Mounted Rifles =

New Zealand Army unit

- Cap badge of Queen Alexandra's Mounted Rifles
- Active: 1864–2025
- Country: New Zealand
- Branch: New Zealand Army
- Type: Mounted Rifles
- Size: Company
- Part of: 1st Battalion Royal New Zealand Infantry Regiment
- Garrison/HQ: Linton Military Camp
- Nickname: QA
- Mottos: Ake Ake Kia Kaha (Forever and Ever Be Strong)
- Colours: Amber and Black
- March: New Colonial
- Anniversaries: 16 September – Regimental Birthday 20 November – Corps Day/Cambrai Day

Commanders
- Current commander: Lieutenant Colonel Caleb Berry
- Colonel Commandant: Colonel(Rtd.) T.J. McComish

Insignia
- Distinguishing Patch

Queen Alexandra's Mounted Rifles (QAMR) was an armoured unit of the New Zealand Army. The unit was first raised in 1864 and existed in various forms as an independent unit until 2025, when it was amalgamated with the 1st Battalion, Royal New Zealand Infantry Regiment.

== History ==
On 16 September 1864, the Alexandra Troop of the Wanganui Cavalry Volunteers was accepted for service by the New Zealand Government. The troop was named after Princess Alexandra, the Princess of Wales. The troop saw active service in the New Zealand Wars, mainly on patrolling and despatch riding duties, before being disbanded in late 1865. Reformed as the Alexandra Cavalry Volunteers, the troop guarded Wanganui during the Titokowaru campaign in 1868, and took part in the Parihaka operation in 1881.

In 1868, Trooper William Lingard, a founding member of the Alexandra Troop, was awarded the New Zealand Cross for his actions at Tauranga-ika on 28 December 1868, where he rescued a wounded comrade under enemy fire. In 1897 the unit was renamed the Alexandra Mounted Rifles. Volunteers from the Alexandra Mounted Rifles served in South Africa during the South African War, where Farrier Sergeant Major William James Hardham was awarded the Victoria Cross for his actions near Naauwpoort on 28 January 1901. During an engagement with Boer forces, Hardham went back under heavy fire to assist the wounded Trooper McCrae, placed him on his own horse, and guided him to safety. In 1911 the unit became the 2nd (Wellington West Coast) Mounted Rifles.

In the First World War (1914–1918) men of the regiment saw active service in the Queen Alexandra's 2nd (Wellington West Coast) Mounted Rifles squadron of the Wellington Mounted Rifles Regiment, New Zealand Mounted Rifles Brigade.

The squadron of 158 men and 169 horses was initially commanded by Major Jim Elmslie. The New Zealand Mounted Rifles Brigade was sent from Egypt to Gallipoli in May 1915, without its horses. On Gallipoli the mounted riflemen gained a reputation as excellent scouts and hard fighters. New Zealand's mounted regiments were particularly prominent in battles fought at Outpost No 3, Table Top, Chunuk Bair and Hill 60. For his gallantry on Chunuk Bair, Major Elmslie was recommended for a posthumous Victoria Cross.

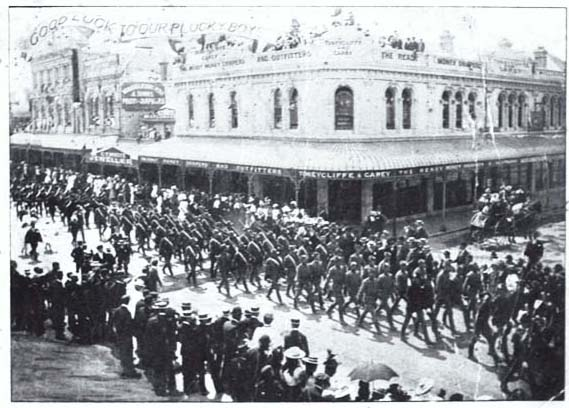
The New Zealand Rough Riders marching through Christchurch before leaving for the Boer War. Sir George Grey Special Collections, Auckland Libraries, 69-2.

Following the Hill 60 battle the 2nd Squadron could only muster 14 fit men. After the evacuation of Gallipoli in December 1915, the squadron spent the remainder of the war on horseback, fighting the Turkish Army in the Sinai Desert and in Palestine, as part of the ANZAC Mounted Division. Notable battles were fought at Rumani, Rafa, Magdhaba, Gaza, Beersheba, Ayun Kara, in the Jordan Valley and at Amman.

The regiment received its first guidon in 1929, at Waverley. During the Second World War (1939–1945) many volunteers from Queen Alexandra's Mounted Rifles served overseas in various units, particularly in the 2nd New Zealand Divisional Cavalry Regiment. This regiment fought in Greece, Crete, North Africa and Italy. Some men also served in the Long Range Desert Group.

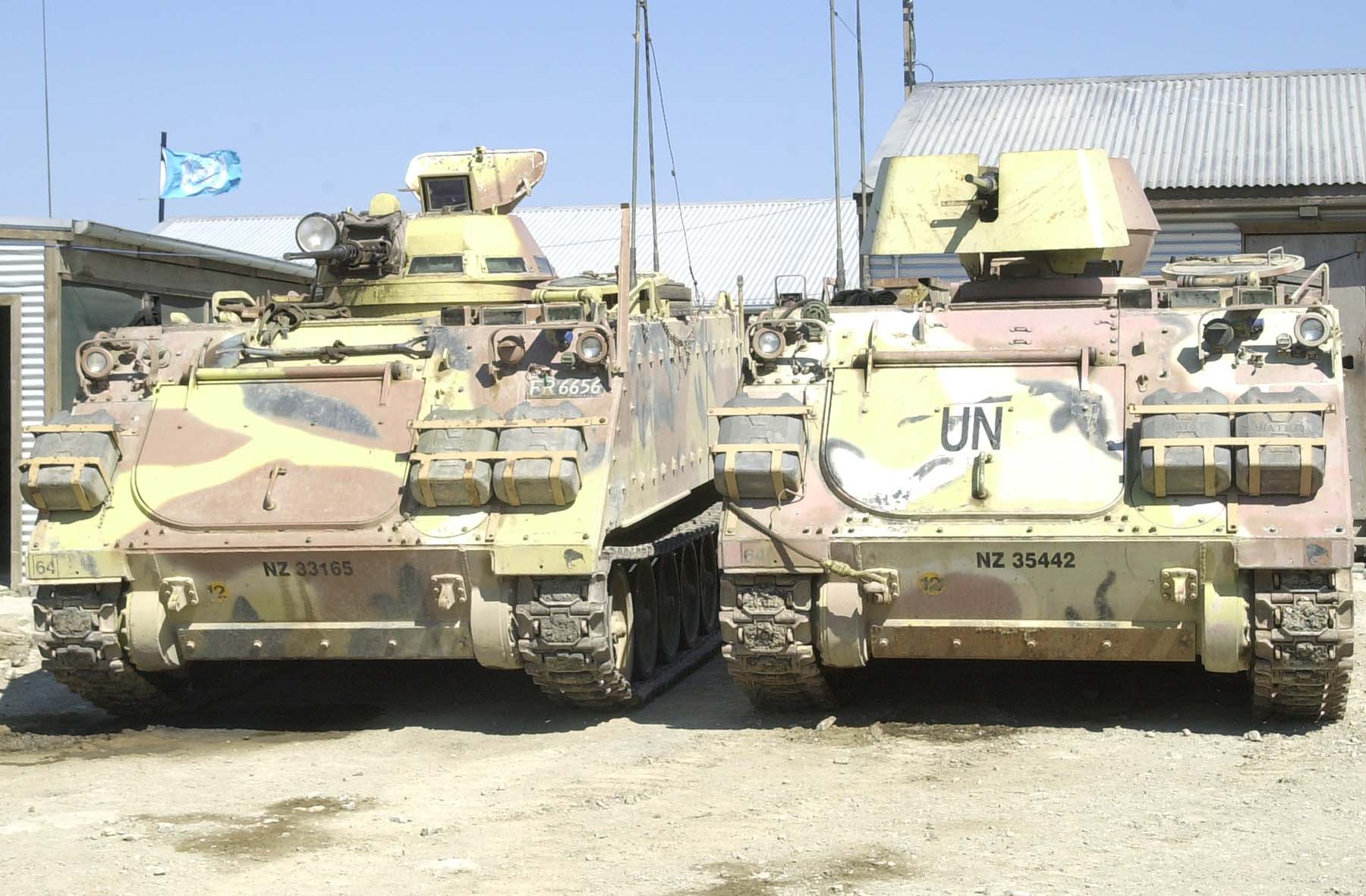
M113A1 APC and Ambulance in East Timor in 2002.

Later in the war some men of the regiment saw active service with the 3rd New Zealand Division's Special Army Tank Squadron Group in the Pacific, and with the 4th New Zealand Armoured Brigade in Italy. Some men of the Divisional Cavalry Regiment performed occupation force duties in Japan after the war. Men of the regiment also served in New Zealand during the war, firstly on horses and then in a wide variety of light armoured vehicles. In January 1942 the New Zealand Armoured Corps was formed. It included the 2nd Light Armoured Fighting Vehicle Regiment (Queen Alexandra's Wellington West Coast Mounted Rifles). In 1947 the Royal New Zealand Armoured Corps (RNZAC) was formed.

Following the Second World War the regiment underwent a series of name, role changes and amalgamations. Some men of the unit served with British Centurion-equipped tank regiments during the Korean War. In November 1964 the Regimental Guidon was paraded for Her Majesty the Queen at Buckingham Palace, by a composite group of 140 members of the New Zealand Army. In 1992 the unit, as Queen Alexandra's Squadron, RNZAC received a new Guidon.

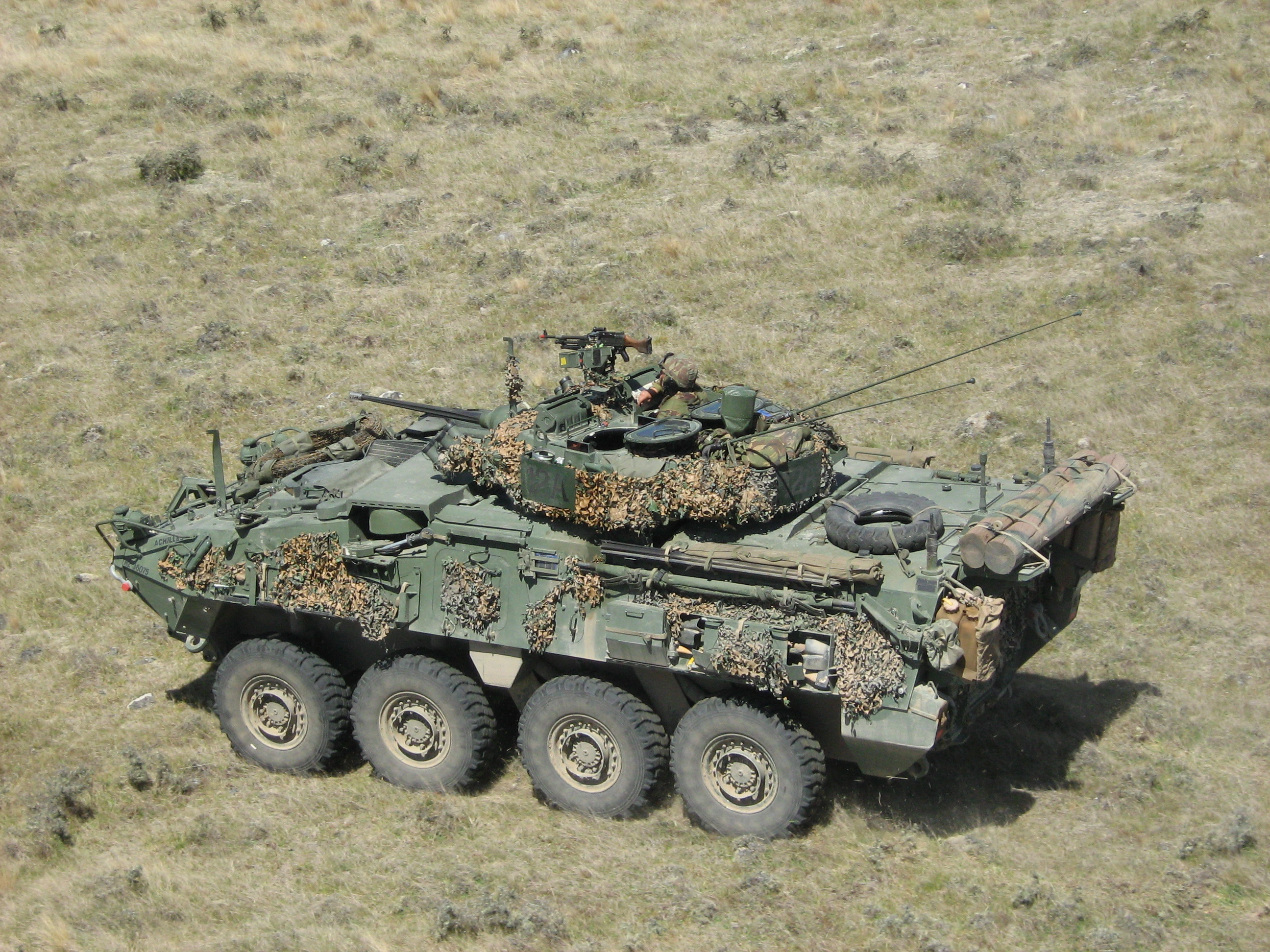
A NZLAV from QAMR.

A year later the unit regained the title of Queen Alexandra's Mounted Rifles, Royal New Zealand Armoured Corps. From 1994 until 2002 most members of the regiment gained operational experience operating M113A1 armoured vehicles in Bosnia-Herzegovina and East Timor. Many other officers and soldiers also crewed British armoured vehicles with British Army regiments in Bosnia-Herzegovina. Over this prolonged period, the regiment sustained a higher operational tempo than any other unit of the New Zealand Army. In 2004, the unit downsized to a squadron, began re-equipping with the NZLAV, a version of the LAV III armoured vehicle especially developed for the New Zealand Army. In 2005 the unit moved to Burnham Military Camp.

In December 2011, Queen Alexandra's Mounted Rifles was formally re-formed as a regiment from its previous squadron size, with the sub-unit formally known as QAMR being dubbed NZ Scottish (NZ Scots) Squadron.

A wide range of armoured vehicles have been used by the unit. These include the Valentine tank, Stuart tank, Daimler Dingo Scout Car, Ferret Armoured Car, Centurion tank, M41 Walker Bulldog, FV101 Scorpion light tank, and M113A1 armoured personnel carriers.

In December 2025 as a result of a review by Army Chief, Major General Rose King, the Queen Alexandra's Mounted Rifles became a sub-unit of 1st Battalion, Royal New Zealand Infantry Regiment.

== Historical composition ==
Prior to Disbandment of the regiment on 5 Dec 2025 it contained the following Sub units

- Regimental Headquarters (RHQ)
- New Zealand Scottish (NZ Scots)
- Wellington East Coast (WEC)
- Waikato Mounted Rifles (WMR)
- Support Squadron

Each Squadron Headquarters operated NZLAV in the command role, while each cavalry troop consisted of between 4 and 6 NZLAV. Support Squadron was a combination of the Quartermasters Store who operate MHOV (RMMV HX range of tactical trucks) and LOV (Pinzgauer) and the Workshop who provided 1st line repair and recovery (LAV-R and LOV or MHOV). The regiment also operated Armoured LOV in a reconnaissance and surveillance role when needed.

QAMR was undertaking crew training on the NZ Army Bushmaster 5.5 vehicles. The vehicles replaced the Army's Armoured Pinzgauers.

Queen Alexander's Mounted Rifles was amalgamated with 1 Battalion, Royal New Zealand Infantry Regiment, forming a Motorised Infantry Battalion, on the 5th of December 2025 at Linton Military Camp. "The combined unit will retain the name 1 RNZIR, with one sub-unit continuing under the QAMR name."

== Guidon, Battle Honours, and Flag ==
The Guidon or regimental colours, are the memorial of the regimental deeds and the symbol of its spirit. At one time they were carried on active service and were the rallying point of the regiment. The colours of a cavalry regiment are traditionally in the form of a Guidon or swallow-tailed flag which derived its name from the French Guyd-homme ("guide man"), who would lead by carrying a flag. These banners were always carried into battle under the guard of an armed escort. In recent times, the use of the Guidon as a rallying point has no longer been necessary, yet even today when they are paraded they are always under the guard of an armed escort. It is now taken on ceremonial parades and inspections to mark a unit's achievements, and displayed to soldiers and spectators that it may provide a memorial to the men of all ranks who served under it and to afford an inspiration for patriotic service and sacrifice to all who may behold it.

The QAMR Guidon

The QAMR Guidon is made of silk and embodies the regimental colours, amber and black. It is unique in that most armoured regiments carry a guidon with a crimson background. With an amber background, the Guidon is surrounded by a fringe of amber and black. In the centre is the unit badge in colour, this in the centre of a black-edged gold circlet inscribed with Queen Alexandra's Squadron, RNZAC. This is surrounded by a wreath of two fern leaves embroidered in dark green and the unit motto, Ake Ake Kia Kaha (For ever and ever be strong). The union wreath is a wreath of a national plant (Canada – maple, Australia – wattle, South Africa – protea). Over the badge appears the Royal Crown.

In the first and fourth corners appears the White Horse of Hanover. The horse signifies that the unit had its origins as a horsed cavalry regiment (Mounted Rifles). Units that started as infantry have goats in the corners of their guidons. The Roman numerals II/VI appear in the second and third corners within two fern leaves. These signify the amalgamation of the 2nd Light Armoured Fighting Vehicles Regiment (Queen Alexandra's Wellington West Coast Mounted Rifles) and the 6th Light Armoured Fighting Vehicles Regiment (Manawatu Mounted Rifles) to form the 2nd N.Z. Armoured Regiment in 1944. (The 9th Light Armoured Fighting Vehicles Regiment (Wellington East Coast Mounted Rifles) was also part of the regiment, however in 1953 split to be become the Divisional Regiment)

Queen Alexandra's Mounted Rifles has 36 battle honours, though only 22 battle honours are shown on the Guidon. The battle honours of the unit which have been approved for emblazonment appear on either side of the central emblem in small gold scrolls, their chronology being from left to right, beginning at the top with the exception of the battle honours "New Zealand" and "South Africa 1899–1902", which appear beneath the unit motto.

The QAMR Guidon is carried by the Squadron Sergeant Major (SSM), with an escort of two Senior Non Commissioned Officers (SNCO).

The regimental flag has six horizontal bands, three each alternately of amber and black. In the top left hand corner is a square of amber on which is embroidered the regimental badge.

== Uniform and insignia ==
The regimental badge is of a punga tree encircled by a baggage strap, bearing (above) Queen Alexandra's and (below) 2nd W.W.C (Wellington West Coast) Mtd Rifles. Below this is the regiments motto "Ake Ake Kia Kaha" meaning "For ever and ever, be strong". This was derived from the war-cry of the Third (Rough Riders) Contingent of the South African Volunteers (Boer War). The original prototypes were made of solid copper, but when issued were of blackened gunmetal. The badge is worn on the New Zealand Army rifle green beret, with RNZAC personnel wearing the badge over the RNZAC green patch. Collar badges of the same pattern are worn with No.2 Dress (mess kit), and No.4 Dress (service dress). The QAMR belt has horizontal stripes of black, amber, black. These colours are those of the Taranaki provincial colours which were adopted by the regiment. In 1993, for ceremonial purposes, the traditional mounted rifles slouch hat was reintroduced with a khaki/green/khaki puggaree. The scarlet and blue mess uniform is that of the RNZAC.

== Alliances ==
- United Kingdom – The Royal Dragoon Guards
- United Kingdom – The Queen's Royal Hussars (Queen's and Royal Irish)
- United Kingdom – The King's Royal Hussars
- United Kingdom – The Royal Tank Regiment
- Australia – 2nd/14th Light Horse Regiment (Queensland Mounted Infantry)
