= 9th (Wellington East Coast) Mounted Rifles =

- Cap Badge of the Wellington East Coast Mounted Rifles
- Active: 1911–1921
- Country: New Zealand
- Allegiance: New Zealand Crown
- Branch: New Zealand Army
- Role: Mounted
- Size: Regiment
- Part of: New Zealand Mounted Rifles Brigade
- Engagements: World War I

Commanders
- Honorary Colonel: The Lord Islington

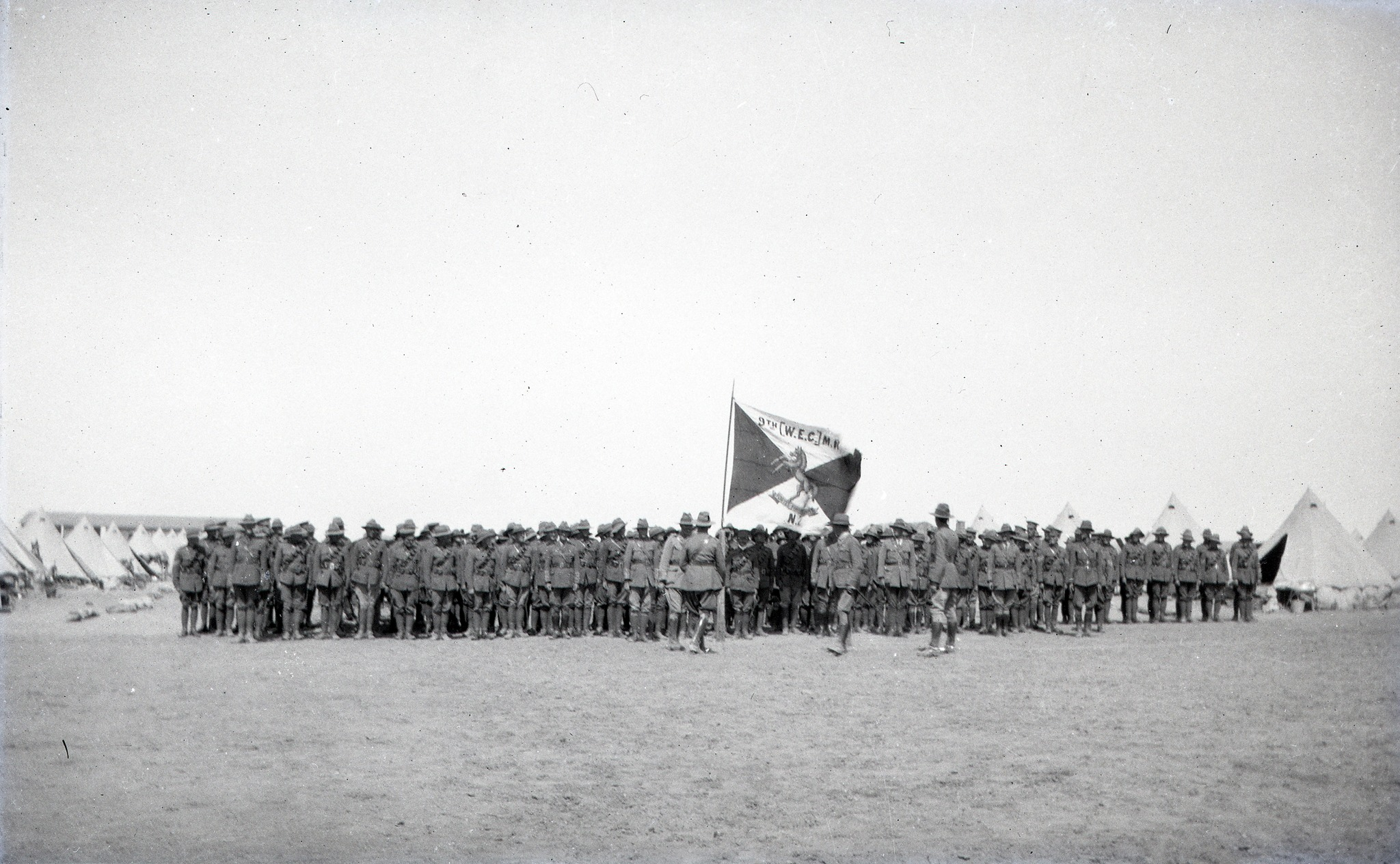
9th Wellington East Coast Squadron, Camp Zeitoun, Egypt, WWI

The 9th (Wellington East Coast) Mounted Rifles Regiment was officially raised on March 17, 1911. It was one of 12 regionally based mounted rifles regiments formed as part of the new Territorial Force (TF) organisation that came into existence on that day. This part-time Territorial Force and a tiny regular force of professional soldiers formed the basis of New Zealand’s army at the outbreak of the First World War.

Instead of mobilising the TF, however, the government decided to raise a separate force to send overseas to fight – the New Zealand Expeditionary Force (NZEF). In 1914 the new mounted regiments of the NZEF were given provincial names corresponding to the military district in which they were raised – Auckland, Wellington, Canterbury or Otago. This gave them some sense of regional identity.

The NZEF mounted regiments were instructed to affiliate each of the three squadrons under their command with a TF mounted rifles regiment from their military district, and to issue the regiment’s badge to the squadron. The idea was to foster linkages with the established TF regiments that were not being sent overseas. So the badge of the 9th (Wellington East Coast) Mounted Rifles Regiment, TF, was worn by the 9th (Wellington East Coast) Squadron of the Wellington Mounted Rifles Regiment.

They served in the Middle Eastern theatre of World War I and first saw action during the Battle of Gallipoli. As a part of the larger New Zealand Mounted Rifles Brigade (of the ANZAC Mounted Division) they went on to serve in the Sinai and Palestine Campaign.

The cap and collar badges for the 9th (Wellington East Coast) Mounted Rifles, a horse rampant over the regimental motto. The collar badges are a smaller version of the cap badge.

Motto: Fortes fortuna juvat (Fortune assists the brave).

== Great War Battles ==
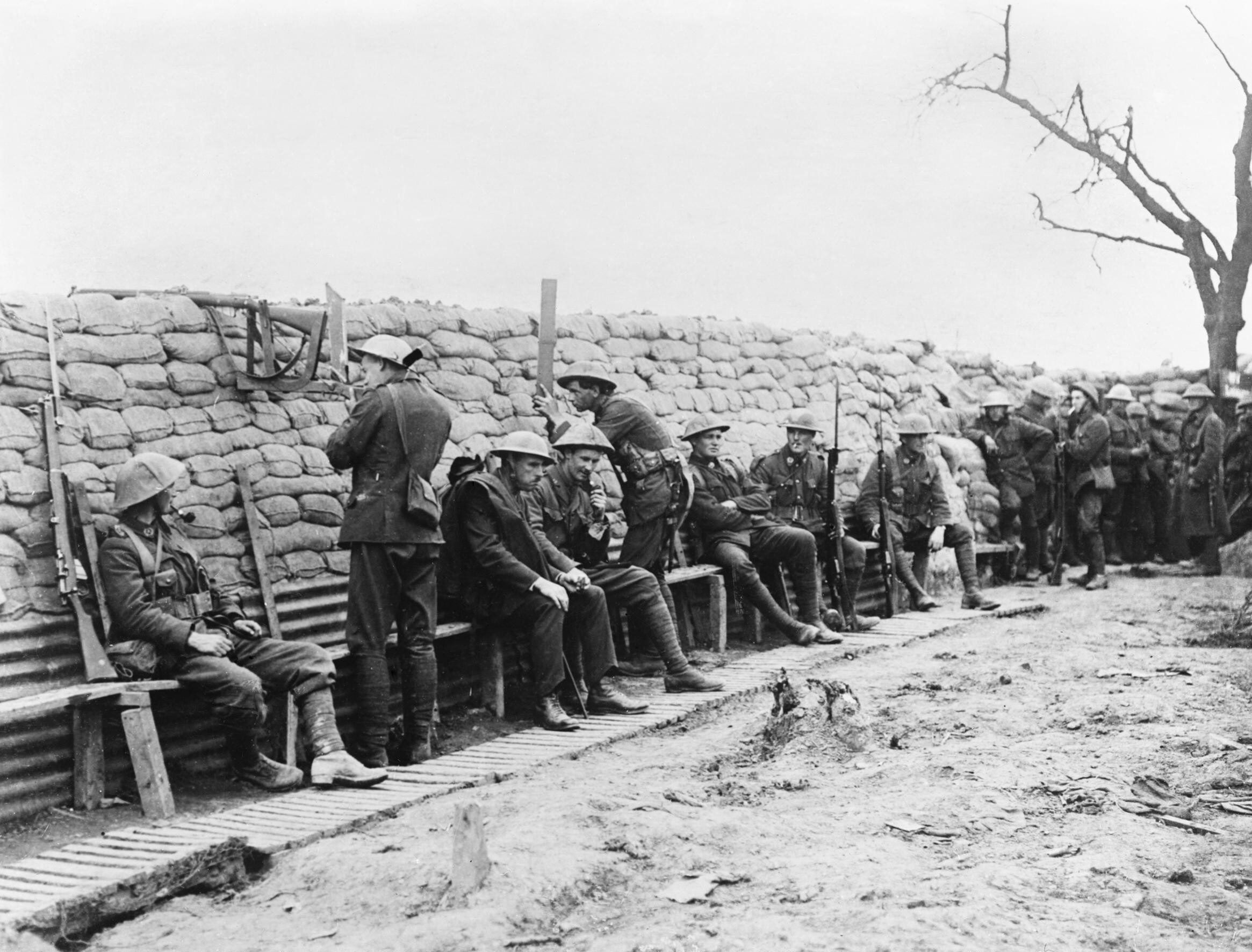
New Zealand troops of the 9th (Wellington East Coast Rifles) Regiment holding a well constructed breastwork near Fleurbaix during June 1916. Note one of the troops using a periscope rifle.

- Battle of Gallipoli
- Battle of Romani
- Battle of Magdhaba
- Battle of Rafa
- First Battle of Gaza
- Second Battle of Gaza
- Third Battle of Gaza
- Battle of Beersheba
- Battle of Megiddo (1918)

== Post World War One ==
In 1921 they became the 7th New Zealand Mounted Rifles (Wellington East Coast) and later still became the Wellington East Coast Mounted Rifles, which was later absorbed into the 2nd Armoured Regiment, on the 29 March 1944.

Hawke’s Bay was a big source for troops and leaders in the 2nd New Zealand Divisional Cavalry in the Second World War. They excelled, they supported each other, and they stuck together like glue.

On 1 April 1956 the unit was renamed the 4th Armoured Regiment (Wellington East Coast) RNZAC with the Headquarters based in Hastings. On being granted the Freedom of the City of Hastings on 7 September 1958 the unit name was adjusted to 4th ARMOURED REGIMENT (WELLINGTON EAST COAST – CITY OF HASTINGS OWN) RNZAC.

In 1963 the unit was amalgamated into 1 Armoured Squadron (Queen Alexandra’s) and on 1 September 1970 it was renamed Queen Alexandra’s (Waikato/Wellington East Coast) Squadron RNZAC with its Headquarters based in at Waiouru.

On 4 June 1982 Waikato and Wellington East Coast Squadron (WaiWEC) RNZAC became part of the newly formed 1 Armoured Group and over the next 11 years was manned with a combination of both Regular Force and Territorial Force personnel. Upon the activation of Queen Alexandra’s Mounted Rifles as a regiment in 1993, it was decided to rename the Squadrons to A, B, and Support Squadron with the Territorial Force component being WaiWEC Squadron.

In 2003 WaiWEC Squadron underwent a title change to better identify the geographic location of its Territorial Force members and the title of Waikato Mounted Rifles was approved by the then Chief of Army. In this approval letter the Chief of Army also directed that the Wellington East Coast Guidon be formally laid up and kept in the preserve of Hastings District Council.

== 9th Wellington East Coast Mounted Rifles regimental guidon ==
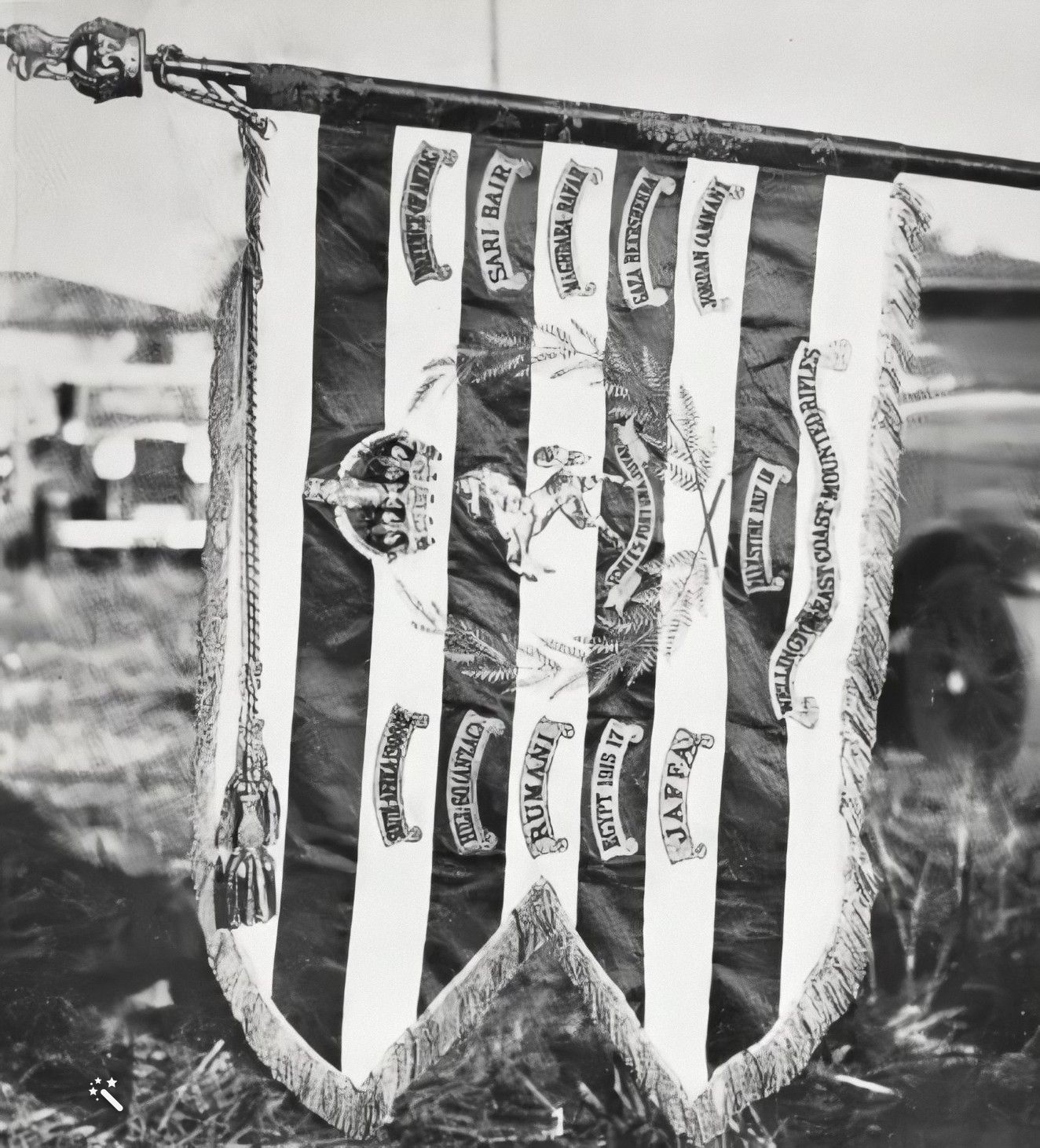
Presented to the regiment on the 12th May 1935

Initially The New Zealand Mounted Rifles regiments were not authorised to carry a standard of any kind, with the result that it was necessary to request permission from the Imperial authorities. In 1927 the New Zealand Mounted Rifles Regiments received permission from King George V to carry guidons.

The guidon was presented to the regiment during a unit camp at Marewa, Napier on 12 May 1935. The guidon was designed, paid for, and presented by Major General Sir Andrew Russell, the former commanding officer of both the Wellington East Coast Mounted Rifles and Wellington Mounted Rifles Regiment, the brigade commander of the Mounted Rifles Brigade at Gallipoli and the general officer commanding the 1st New Zealand Expeditionary Force in France 1916-1918. The consecration of the guidon was conducted by the Reverend R. H. Williams Bishop of Waiapu. The Commanding Officer for the parade was Lieutenant Colonel H. B. Maunsell, a former officer of the 9th (Wellington East Coast) Squadron who had been wounded at Gallipoli in 1915. A crowd of up to 4000 people attended the parade.

The guidon of the 9th Wellington East Coast Mounted Rifles Regiment is unique for its distinct New Zealand design and incorporation of the regional black and white of Hawke’s Bay. The guidon is made of black and white silk damask embroidered and fringed with gold. The tassels and cord of crimson and gold mixed. The sleeve at the pole end is crimson silk.

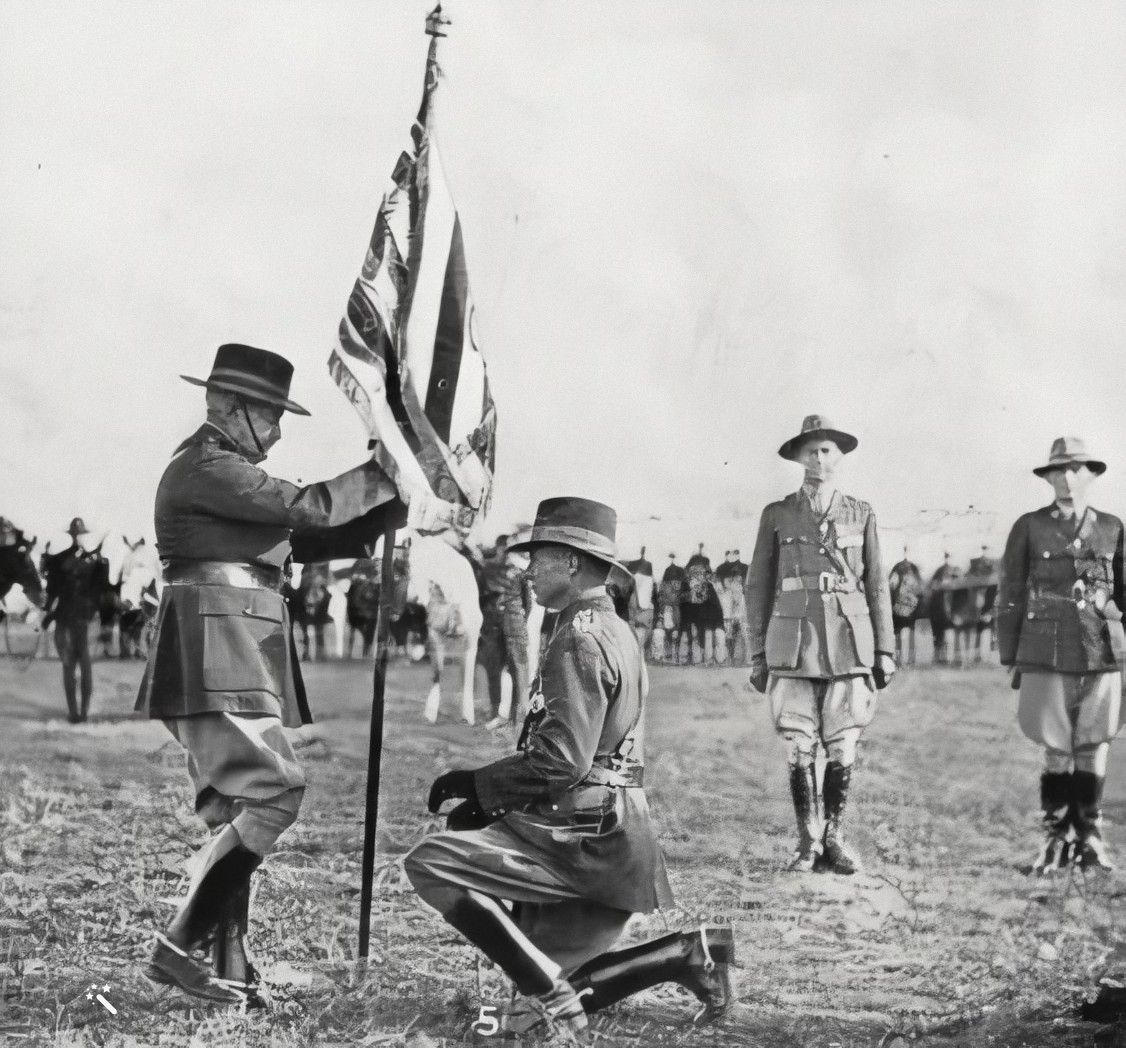
Sir Andrew Russell presents the new guidon to the commanding officer 9WECMR

The guidon is divided horizontally into five white and four black bands. In the centre is the badge of the Wellington East Coast Mounted Rifles in gold, surrounded by a wreath of green New Zealand ferns. The whole centrepiece is surmounted by the Kings Crown in full colour. The Regimental Badge is of a horse rampant surmounting the Regimental Motto “FORTES FORTUNA JUVAT” Fortune Favours The Brave.

The battle honours of the unit are emblazoned on both sides of the guidon with black lettering on gold scrolls, and placed in sequence from left to right down the Guidon. A gold scroll with Wellington East Coast Mounted Rifles in black is at the base of the guidon.

The following battle honours and campaigns are emblazoned on the Guidon:

SOUTH AFRICA 1900-1902

HILL 60 (ANZAC)

RUMANI

EGYPT 1915-1917

JAFFA

PALESTINE 1917-1918

JORDAN (AMMAN)

GAZA BEERSHEEBA

MAGHDABA RAFFA

SARI BAIR

DEFENCE OF ANZAC

=== Custodianship of the Hastings District Council ===
The guidon was placed in Saint Matthew’s Church Hastings from 1941-1958. Initially it had been placed in the church for safekeeping during World War II.

In August 1959, after its many years of use, the guidon was retired and after some time a decision was made for the guidon to be transferred to the council for safekeeping to represent the bond between the community represented by the council, and the regiment.

The town clerk reported the day the guidon was presented to council:

a number of Officers, Non-Commissioned Officers, and men of the Wellington East Coast Regiment (City of Hastings Own) R.N.Z.A.C. desired to present to the Council for safe keeping the Regimental Guidon and were in attendance at the door of the Council Chamber. He asked if the Mayor was ready to receive them.

The Mayor signified that he was ready and with the Town Clerk took a position near to the case that had been provided for the reception of the Guidon.

Captain R. Matthews, Chaplain attended by Officers and supported by men of the Regiment, then entered the Council Chamber carrying the Guidon and halted in front of the Mayor. He then, on behalf of the Commanding Officer and all ranks of the Regiment, requested that the Council accept and keep in safe custody the Regimental Guidon.

His Worship the Mayor replied –

With a full sense of responsibility and privilege we accept the custody of the Guidon of your Regiment. It gives us great pleasure and satisfaction to accede to your request because it gives further emphasis to the identity of sympathy and interest which exists between the Council representing the people of this City and the Regiment, and establishes this Chamber as the repository of one of our most precious possessions of the Regiment, the Guidon on which is embroidered the Battle Honours of the Regiment. Your Guidon immortalises all who by their sacrifice on so many scattered battle fields of the world have brought honour and renown to this Regiment. Which we of the City of Hastings are now so proud to call our own.

The Guidon will remain in this locked container of which your Commanding Officer or his delegate will retain a key and will be immediately available to any authorised officer for the purposes of the Regiment. Except for such occasions and purposes it will remain locked in this container. In rendering this service as in all other matters where we can serve or advance the interest of the Regiment we shall continue to feel a high sense of privilege.

The Mayor then requested Captain Matthews to hang the Guidon in the case on the Council Chamber wall. The case was then closed and locked by the Mayor who retained the key and returned to his seat.

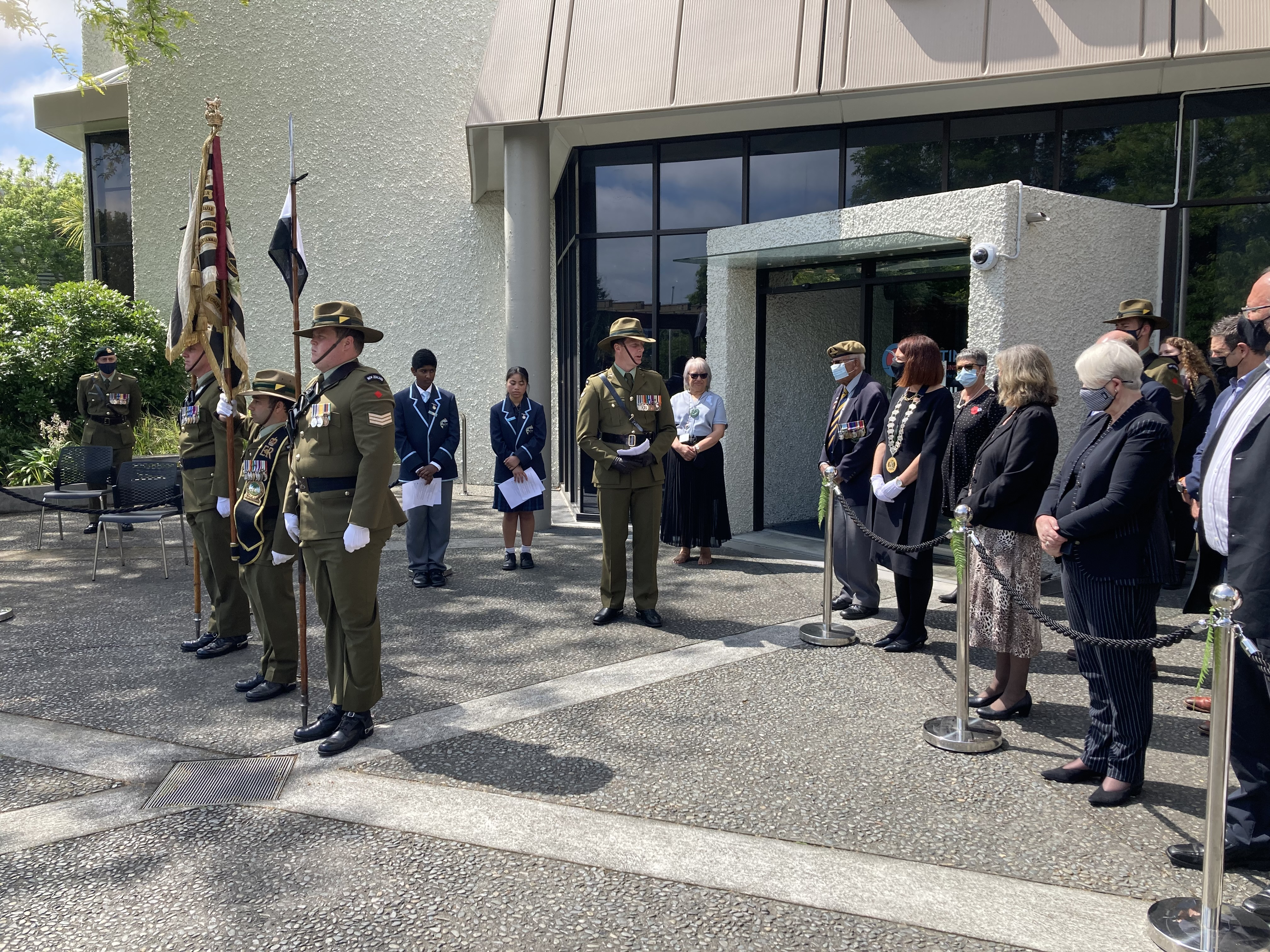
The 9WECMR is paraded on Armistice Day 2021.

Over the years the guidon has been retrieved by the successive units of the Armoured Corps that have to be paraded for official occasions, charter parades and other ceremonial events. For some time the guidon was also used by the Queen Alexandra’s Squadron because no replacement guidon had been sourced since it was laid up in Hawera.

The guidon was most recently retrieved by the Wellington East Coast Squadron, Queen Alexandra's Mounted Rifles on Armistice Day 2021. The guidon was retrieved from its cases and paraded to the forecourt of the Hastings District Council Civic Administration Building before being encased and returned to Linton Camp in an armoured vehicle.

The guidon will be formally laid up with the Hastings District Council in 2025.

== Alliances ==
- United Kingdom – 7th Queen's Own Hussars
