= Salmaneh, Khuzestan =

Salmaneh سلمانه
- Village
- Location within Iran
- Coordinates: 31°05′32″N 49°06′41″E
- Country: Iran
- Province: Khuzestan
- County: Ahvaz
- Bakhsh: Central
- Rural District: Gheyzaniyeh

Population (2006)
  - Total: 42
- Time zone: UTC+3:30 (IRST)
  - Summer (DST): UTC+4:30 (IRDT)

Salmaneh (Persian: سلمانه, also Romanized as Salmāneh; also known as Salmāna) is a village in Gheyzaniyeh Rural District, in the Central District of Ahvaz County, Khuzestan Province, Iran. At the 2006 census, its population was 42, in 5 families.
