= Avondale, Auckland =

Avondale
- Suburb
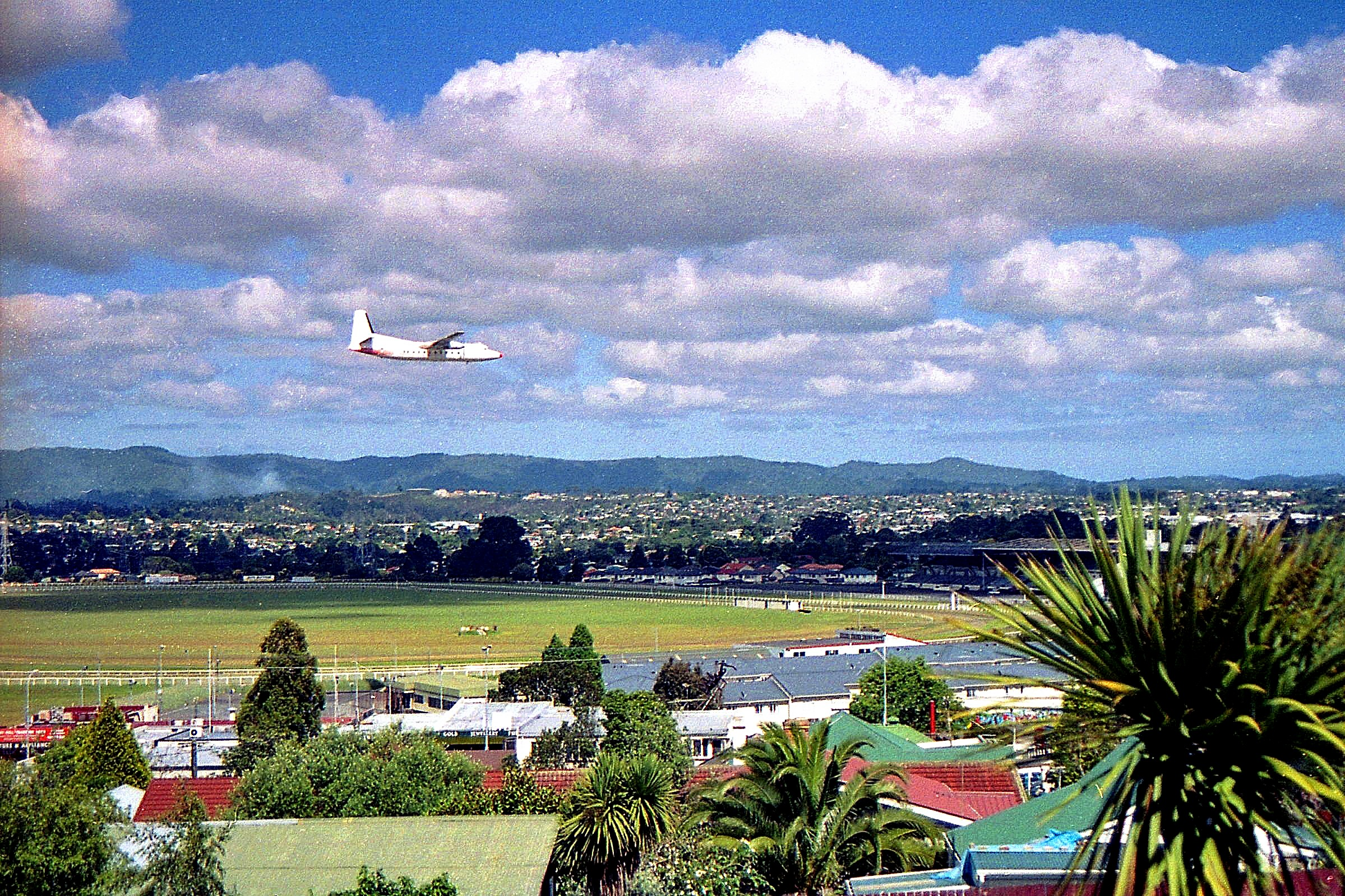
- Avondale suburb and the Avondale Racecourse
- Interactive map of Avondale
- Coordinates: 36.8985°S 174.6967°E
- Country: New Zealand
- City: Auckland
- Local authority: Auckland Council
- Electoral ward: Whau ward
- Local board: Whau Local Board
- Established: c. 1850s

Area
  - Land: 594 ha (1,470 acres)

Population (June 2025)
  - Total: 26,450
  - Density: 4,450/km^{2} (11,500/sq mi)
- Train stations: Avondale Railway Station

Rosebank	Waterview	Mount Albert
(Whau River)	Avondale	Owairaka
New Lynn	Blockhouse Bay	New Windsor

Avondale (/ˈævənˌdeɪl/ AV-ən-dayl) (Māori: Te Whau) is a suburb of Auckland, New Zealand, located to the east of the Whau River on the Auckland isthmus. Avondale was established as a small settlement but grew following the establishment of a railway line, which in turn led to the establishment of brickworks. Following the settlement's growth an independent borough was formed, but was soon amalgamated into the City of Auckland.

== Geography ==
Avondale is one of the westernmost suburbs of the Auckland isthmus, forming the eastern shores of the Whau River, an estuarial arm of the Waitematā Harbour.

== History ==
=== European settlement ===
The eastern shores of the Whau River was originally known by European settlers as Te Whau, until the 1880s. Whau is the Māori language name for Entelea arborescens, a native tree. The first European settler in the area was John Sheddon Adam in 1843. In 1845, the first wooden bridge across the Whau River was built. Settlement of the area did not occur in larger numbers until the late 1850s, with the completion of Great North Road. The name Avondale was popularised by John Bollard, who arrived in the area in 1861 and named the area for the Avondale Forest in County Wicklow, Ireland. Bollard became a prominent community leader and a Member of Parliament, living in Avondale until his death in 1915.

Expansion was rapid, with churches, stores and a public hall built by 1867. In 1880, the North Auckland Line railway stations opened along the Auckland isthmus and West Auckland, extending to Helensville by 1881, which included a station at Avondale. The new connection to Auckland led to a significant increase in growth in the area. Taking advantage of the newly opened station, New Zealand businessman William Hunt opened a brickworks adjacent to the railway line at St Georges Road, which continued to manufacture clay goods until 1969. Other early industries in the Avondale area included tanneries and mills. Avondale also had numerous market gardens, especially on the Rosebank Peninsula. It was here that the "Hayward" cultivar of the Chinese gooseberry, later known as the kiwifruit, was developed by Hayward Wright. In the late 19th century, Chinese-New Zealander Chan Ah Chee purchased 26 acres at land at Avondale, using the land as market gardens.

The Whau Road District became the Avondale Road District on 5 June 1882. In 1888, the Avondale Jockey Club formed, and began holding events at the Avondale Racecourse. In 1912, the racecourse was used as a military training camp for the 3rd (Auckland) Mounted Rifles during World War I, as an airfield in the following year, and as a temporary hospital during the 1918 influenza pandemic.

=== Suburban development ===
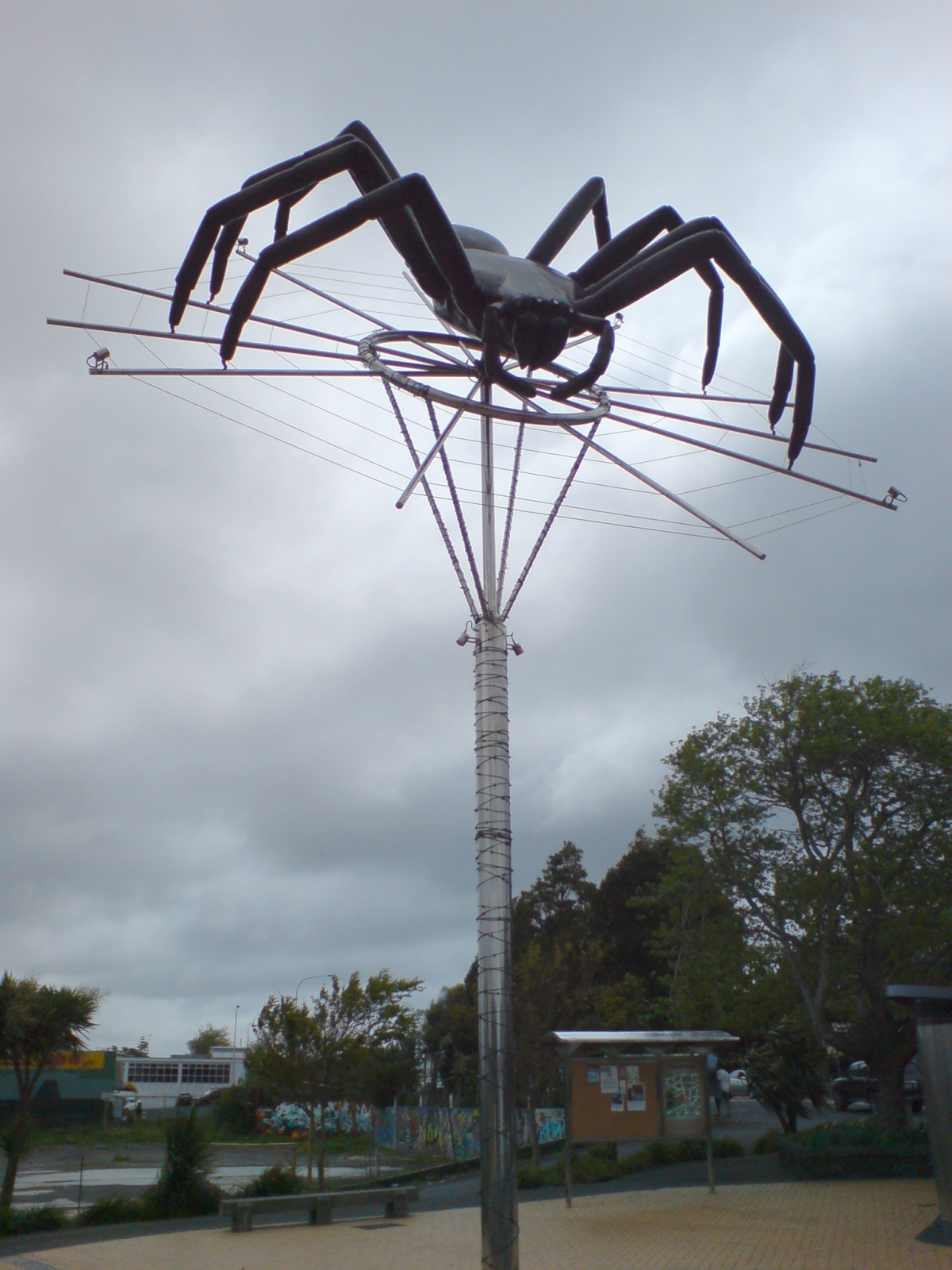
Local sculpture of the suburb's spider icon.

From the mid-1920s Avondale became increasingly suburban. With a greater need to provide infrastructure for the area, the Avondale Borough Council was formed in 1922, it planned to take out a large loan to pay for these costs. The residents of Avondale voted against this plan, and instead voted to amalgamate with the City of Auckland to the east, in the hope that the city would be better able to finance works projects. After the vote was successful, Avondale Borough was absorbed into the Auckland City in 1927.

In 1924, a new town hall was built for the Avondale Borough. After the merger with Auckland City, there was no longer a need for borough offices, and the town hall was repurposed as a cinema, now known as the Hollywood Cinema.

In 1963, LynnMall, the first American-style shopping centre was opened in the neighbouring suburb of New Lynn. This negatively affected many of the shops in Avondale throughout the 1960s and 1970s.

=== 3 Guys supermarket ===
Albert Gubay began building his fifth 3 Guys supermarket in Avondale in 1974. It operated from September 1975 to June 1997, but was plagued by building consent issues and was eventually demolished. Auckland City Council took ownership of the site, selling part of it for private development in 2001.

Most of the site was still vacant in 2019. The site became popular for street art in 2017, and a structure was built to host street art in 2021.

A similarly named "Free Guys Supermarket" opened in Avondale during the COVID-19 pandemic to provide free groceries to low-income households.

=== Redevelopment ===
In 2017, the council-controlled organisation Panuku Development Auckland announced a major redevelopment of Avondale town centre, including a new library building, community and recreation centre, increased housing and local business development. Since the 2010s, medium and high-density housing has become more commonly seen in Avondale, including such developments as the Highbury Triangle, a purpose-built Kāinga Ora complex primarily for older residents.

A planned new construction in the area is the Whau River walkway, creating easier walking connections between Avondale and the suburbs on the western shores of the Whau River.

== The Avondale spider ==
The so-called Avondale spider (Delena cancerides), an introduced species of a spectacular but harmless Australian huntsman spider, was for decades only found in the area surrounding Avondale, and thus received its New Zealand name. It was introduced to New Zealand in the mid-1920s, likely in a shipment of timber to the Aitkins Timber Yard in Patiki Road. The species was allowed to spread into neighbouring areas, so that its distribution pattern might help identify future dispersal patterns of introduced species. Since then, the spider has become a symbol of Avondale.

== Demographics ==
Avondale covers 5.94 km^{2} (2.29 sq mi) and had an estimated population of 26,450 as of June 2025, with a population density of 4,453 people per km^{2}.

Historical population
Year	Pop.	±% p.a.
2006	19,890	—
2013	21,081	+0.83%
2018	22,992	+1.75%
2023	23,355	+0.31%

Avondale had a population of 23,355 in the 2023 New Zealand census, an increase of 363 people (1.6%) since the 2018 census, and an increase of 2,274 people (10.8%) since the 2013 census. There were 11,865 males, 11,382 females and 108 people of other genders in 7,335 dwellings. 4.0% of people identified as LGBTIQ+. There were 4,458 people (19.1%) aged under 15 years, 5,160 (22.1%) aged 15 to 29, 11,172 (47.8%) aged 30 to 64, and 2,559 (11.0%) aged 65 or older.

People could identify as more than one ethnicity. The results were 34.3% European (Pākehā); 12.3% Māori; 26.0% Pasifika; 38.3% Asian; 4.5% Middle Eastern, Latin American and African New Zealanders (MELAA); and 1.5% other, which includes people giving their ethnicity as "New Zealander". English was spoken by 89.8%, Māori language by 2.9%, Samoan by 8.2%, and other languages by 33.5%. No language could be spoken by 2.9% (e.g. too young to talk). New Zealand Sign Language was known by 0.5%. The percentage of people born overseas was 47.2, compared with 28.8% nationally.

Religious affiliations were 36.9% Christian, 8.5% Hindu, 6.6% Islam, 0.8% Māori religious beliefs, 2.3% Buddhist, 0.4% New Age, 0.1% Jewish, and 1.7% other religions. People who answered that they had no religion were 37.3%, and 5.8% of people did not answer the census question.

Of those at least 15 years old, 5,754 (30.4%) people had a bachelor's or higher degree, 7,332 (38.8%) had a post-high school certificate or diploma, and 5,814 (30.8%) people exclusively held high school qualifications. 2,031 people (10.7%) earned over $100,000 compared to 12.1% nationally. The employment status of those at least 15 was that 10,092 (53.4%) people were employed full-time, 2,022 (10.7%) were part-time, and 828 (4.4%) were unemployed.

Individual statistical areas
Name	Area (km^{2})	Population	Density (per km^{2})	Dwellings	Median age	Median income
Avondale Rosebank	0.94	4,071	4,331	1,197	35.2 years	$40,000
Avondale West	0.74	3,954	5,343	1,149	35.4 years	$38,900
Avondale North West	0.82	2,640	3,220	900	34.6 years	$46,200
Avondale North East	0.50	2,403	4,806	819	35.2 years	$51,300
Avondale Central	1.12	2,817	2,515	1,035	35.5 years	$39,100
Avondale South	1.18	4,494	3,808	1,413	33.5 years	$40,700
Glenavon	0.64	2,976	4,650	822	32.2 years	$35,400
New Zealand					38.1 years	$41,500

== Local government ==
The first local government in the area was the Whau Highway District, which formed 5 October 1868. This was renamed the Avondale Road district in 1882. Avondale grew into a self-governing borough in 1922. The borough merged with the Auckland City in 1927. In November 2010, all cities and districts of the Auckland Region were amalgamated into a single body, governed by the Auckland Council.

Avondale is in the Whau local board area, which elects the seven-member Whau Local Board. Residents of Avondale also elect a single Whau ward councillor, who represents the area on the Auckland Council.

=== Mayors of Avondale Borough Council ===
Between 1922 and 1927, the Avondale Borough had four mayors.

- 1922–1923 James Watkin Kinniburgh
- 1923–1927 William John Tait
- 1927–1927 Edward Ernest Copsey
- 1927–1927 Herbert Tiarks

== Amenities ==
=== Education ===
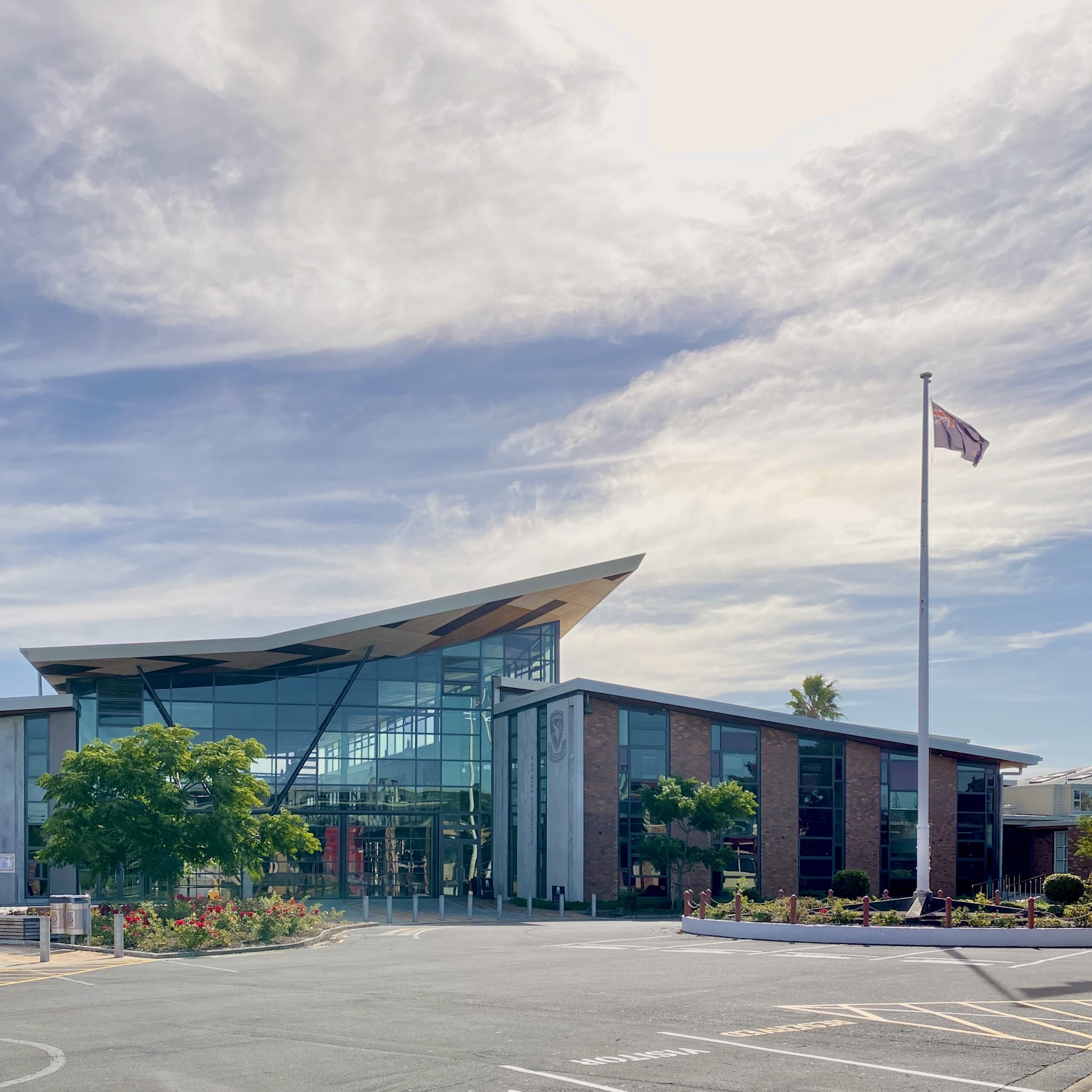
Avondale College atrium

- Avondale College is a state secondary (years 9-15) school with a roll of 2,789 students. It is one of the largest high schools in New Zealand. Avondale Intermediate is a school for years 7-8 with a roll of 381. It shares the site with Avondale College. Both schools opened in 1945.
- Avondale Primary School and Rosebank School are coeducational state contributing primary (years 1-6) schools with rolls of 367 and 564 students, respectively. Avondale School was one of the earliest schools in Auckland, opening in 1860.
- Jireh Christian School is a state-integrated full primary (years 1-8) school which opened in 2018 at the site of Immanuel Christian School. It has a roll of 284.
- St Mary's Catholic School is a state-integrated full primary (years 1-8) school with a roll of 170. It opened in 1923.

All these schools are coeducational. Rolls are as of July 2026.

=== Sports ===
The Avondale Jockey Club operates the Avondale Racecourse - one of only two gallops tracks in suburban Auckland. The racecourse is also the location of the Avondale Sunday markets, the largest in the country. The interior of the racecourse is occupied by several sports fields, which are used for rugby union, rugby league, soccer and cricket. A set of netball courts are located adjacent to the racecourse. Additional sports facilities are located along Rosebank Road, at Eastdale Reserve and Riversdale Reserve.

=== Transport ===
Avondale Railway Station is situated on the East West Line of Auckland's metropolitan rail network.

=== Libraries ===
Avondale has a local branch of the Auckland Libraries system.

=== Entertainment ===
==== The Hollywood Cinema ====
There were movies in the Avondale Town Hall from 1900, but it wasn't until the building was upgraded in 1915 and 1924 to be a more functional cinema, that they were shown on a regular basis. The hall has been used as a cinema and performing arts centre by a variety of managers and became officially known as The Hollywood Cinema in 1966 when it was taken over and run by Jan Grefstad, until his death in 2001. Over the years it became known for midnight showings of The Rocky Horror Picture Show and performances on a Wurlitzer organ. Under new ownership since 2015, it continues to show movies and present concerts by international artists such as Billy Bragg, and local musicians, including Marlon Willams.

=== Places of worship ===
Avondale has several places of worship, including multiple churches, a Hindu temple, a mosque, and a Seventh-Day Adventist Church Plant (ACTS Community Church).

== Bibliography ==
- Buffett, Peter (1989). New Lynn Jubilee 1929-1989: The History of New Lynn. New Lynn Borough Council.
- Diamond, John T. (1992). "The Brick and Pottery Industry in the Western Districts". In Northcote-Bade, James (ed.). West Auckland Remembers. Vol. 2. West Auckland Historical Society. ISBN 0-473-01587-0.
- Dickey, Hugh (2020). Whau Now, Whau Then. Blockhouse Bay Historical Society. ISBN 978-0-473-54013-5.
- Grefstad, Jan (2001). History of the Whau Public Hall, Avondale Town Hall, Grosvenor Theatre, Hollywood Cinema Avondale: Celebrating 77 Years Entertaining Avondale & District. Self published.
- Mackintosh, Lucy (2021). Shifting Grounds: Deep Histories of Tāmaki Makaurau Auckland. Bridget Williams Books. doi:10.7810/9781988587332. ISBN 978-1-988587-33-2.
- Truttman, Lisa (2003). Heart of the Whau, The Story of the Centre of Avondale 1841-2001. Words Incorporated.
- Bloomfield, Gerald Taylor (1973). The Evolution of Local Government Areas in Metropolitan Auckland, 1840-1971. Auckland: Auckland University Press. ISBN 0-19-647714-X.
