= Charles Mackesy =

New Zealand military leader and farmer

Charles Ernest Randolph Mackesy
- Born: 9 January 1861; Dublin, Ireland
- Died: 20 November 1925 (aged 64); Whangārei, New Zealand
- Military career
- Allegiance: New Zealand
- Branch: New Zealand Military Forces
- Service years: 1900–1919
- Rank: Colonel
- Commands: Auckland Mounted Rifles Regiment (1914–17); 11th (North Auckland) Mounted Rifles (1911–14)
- Conflicts: First World War; Gallipoli campaign; Sinai and Palestine campaign
- Awards: Companion of the Order of St Michael and St George; Commander of the Order of the British Empire; Distinguished Service Order; Mentioned in Despatches (3)

Colonel Charles Ernest Randolph Mackesy CMG, CBE, DSO (9 January 1861 – 20 November 1925) was a New Zealand military leader and farmer.

Born in 1861 in Ireland, Mackesy moved to New Zealand in the 1890s and took up farming in Whangārei. A soldier in the Volunteer Force, he volunteered for service with the New Zealand Expeditionary Force (NZEF) on the outbreak of the First World War. He was commander of Auckland Mounted Rifles Regiment, serving briefly at Gallipoli, and more substantially during the campaign in the Sinai and Palestine. From April 1917 he carried out administrative roles for the remainder of the war, apart from periods of leave. Discharged from the NZEF in late 1919 he returned to his farm in New Zealand. He died of heart failure in 1925.

== Early life ==
Charles Ernest Randolph Mackesy was born in Dublin, County Dublin, Ireland on 9 January 1861 to Fanny Johnston Bell, the widow of Ernest Randolph Mackesy. His father, a former officer in the 97th Regiment of Foot, had sold his commission and bought a property of 268 acres near Whangārei, in the New Ulster Province of New Zealand. He died at Auckland in October 1860, a few months before the birth of his son. When Mackesy was young, his family paid for his education in France, Switzerland, and Germany, turning him into an accomplished linguist and athlete. Before the age of twenty, he moved to the United States, where he met Jessie Adam. They were married in the town of Dalis Peak, Kansas, in November 1880.

== New Zealand ==
In the 1890s, Mackesy moved to Whangārei to take up farming on his father's land which had been close to being repossessed due to non-payment of rates. His wife, and their three children, followed shortly afterwards. He soon turned the farm into a profitable enterprise and later set up a land agency. He became active in politics, unsuccessfully challenging a long-serving fellow-Irishman, Robert Thompson, at the 1899 election to the New Zealand House of Representatives in the Marsden electorate.

Mackesy was a supporter of British Israelism, on which he gave lectures in New Zealand and Australia. He believed the United States and the British Empire would join to win a great war which would usher in the Millennium. This led him to join the Marsden Mounted Rifles, a unit of the Volunteer Force, and by 1911 he had reached the rank of lieutenant colonel and was commander of the 11th (North Auckland) Mounted Rifles.

== First World War ==
On the outbreak of the First World War, Mackesy volunteered for the New Zealand Expeditionary Force (NZEF) being raised for military service overseas in aid of the war effort. He was given command of the Auckland Mounted Rifles Regiment (AMR) and oversaw its training at Epson Camp. Sent to the Middle East with the main body of the NZEF, the AMR, sans their horses which were left back in Egypt, served at Gallipoli from May 1915. He was a well regarded officer, noted for his initiative but he also gained a reputation for being outspoken.

The AMR, on arriving at Gallipoli, initially defended the lines at Walker's Ridge and here Mackesy fought in the Third attack on Anzac Cove, at one stage countermanding orders to attack when he spotted a build up of Turkish forces in the opposing trenches. Shortly afterwards he was sent to Egypt to take command of the base of the New Zealand Mounted Rifles Brigade. While stationed in Egypt he was mentioned in despatches twice.

After the end of the fighting in Gallipoli, Mackesy served in the Sinai and Palestine Campaign as commander of the AMR and at times was acting commander of the New Zealand Mounted Rifles Brigade. An advocate for British-Israeli relations, he gained particular satisfaction when the AMR advanced into Palestine. He gave up command of the AMR in April 1917, to become Administrator of the Khan Yunus-Deir El Belah area.

Awarded the Distinguished Service Order in 1917, Mackesy was appointed a Companion of the Order of St Michael and St George the same year. He then briefly commanded a training regiment, having received the temporary rank of colonel, and went back to New Zealand on furlough in late 1917. He returned to the Middle East in early 1918 and took command of New Zealand training units in Egypt. He finished the war as Military Governor of Es Sal-Amman District in Jordan and supervised the transfer of power back to Arab administrators. He was mentioned in dispatches for a third time early in 1919 and later that year was appointed a Commander of the Order of the British Empire for "valuable services rendered in connection with Military Operations in Egypt".

== Later life ==
In November 1919, aged 58, Mackesy resigned his commission in the NZEF and returned to his farm and civilian life. In 1921, he expanded his land agency business, opening an office in Auckland. His wife died in August 1920, and in January 1925 he remarried, but died before the end of the year of heart failure, survived by his second wife and two sons, a third son having been killed at Gallipoli.

Mackesy Park in Whangārei is named for him.
