= Avondale Racecourse =

Horse racing venue in Auckland, New Zealand

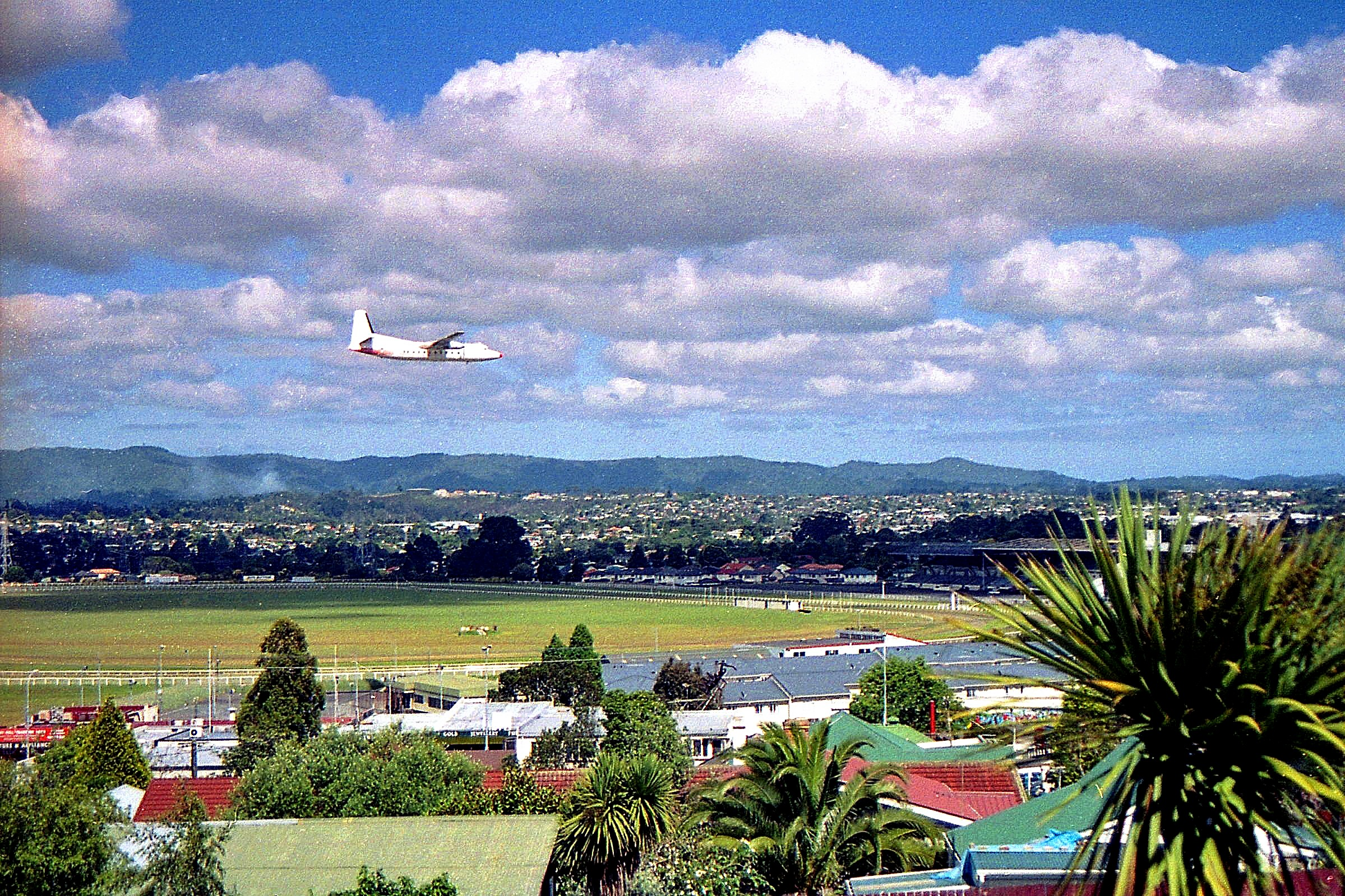
- Interactive map of Avondale Racecourse
- Address: 22 Elm Street, Avondale, Auckland 1026
- Coordinates: 36.897°S 174.691°E

Avondale Racecourse is a horse racing venue in Avondale, Auckland, New Zealand. First established in 1888, the racecourse has been used as a military training facility and as a temporary hospital. Currently the racecourse is used as a venue for the Avondale Jockey Club, sports fields for rugby union, rugby league, soccer and cricket, as a location of the Avondale Sunday Markets.

== History ==
The racecourse was first opened in 1888, with the original grandstand replaced in 1902. During the First World War, the racecourse was used as a military camp for the 3rd (Auckland) Mounted Rifles from 1912, and from 1913 as an airfield. On 13 April 1913, Frederik E. Sandford flew the rebuilt biplane Manurewa at the racecourse; a biplane formerly owned and flown by the Walsh Brothers before it crashed. After the war, the racecourse became a temporary hospital for the 1918 flu pandemic. In 1923, the site was used for motorcycle races. During World War II, the racecourse was again put into use as a training facility.

In 1989 the Avondale Jockey Club sold off a large portion of land, which was re-developed as housing.

Attendance at racecourse events have declined in the 21st century, however the venue has been renewed attendance due to the refurbishment of the Ellerslie Racecourse. The Avondale Jockey Club's thoroughbred racing licence ends in 2026.

== Avondale Sunday Market ==
The Avondale Sunday Market is one of the largest regular markets in New Zealand, first established in the 1970s, and developed due to the growth of migration of different ethnic groups to Auckland.
