= Hollywood Cinema (New Zealand theatre) =

Theatre in Auckland, New Zealand

Coordinates: 36.89923°S 174.69711°E

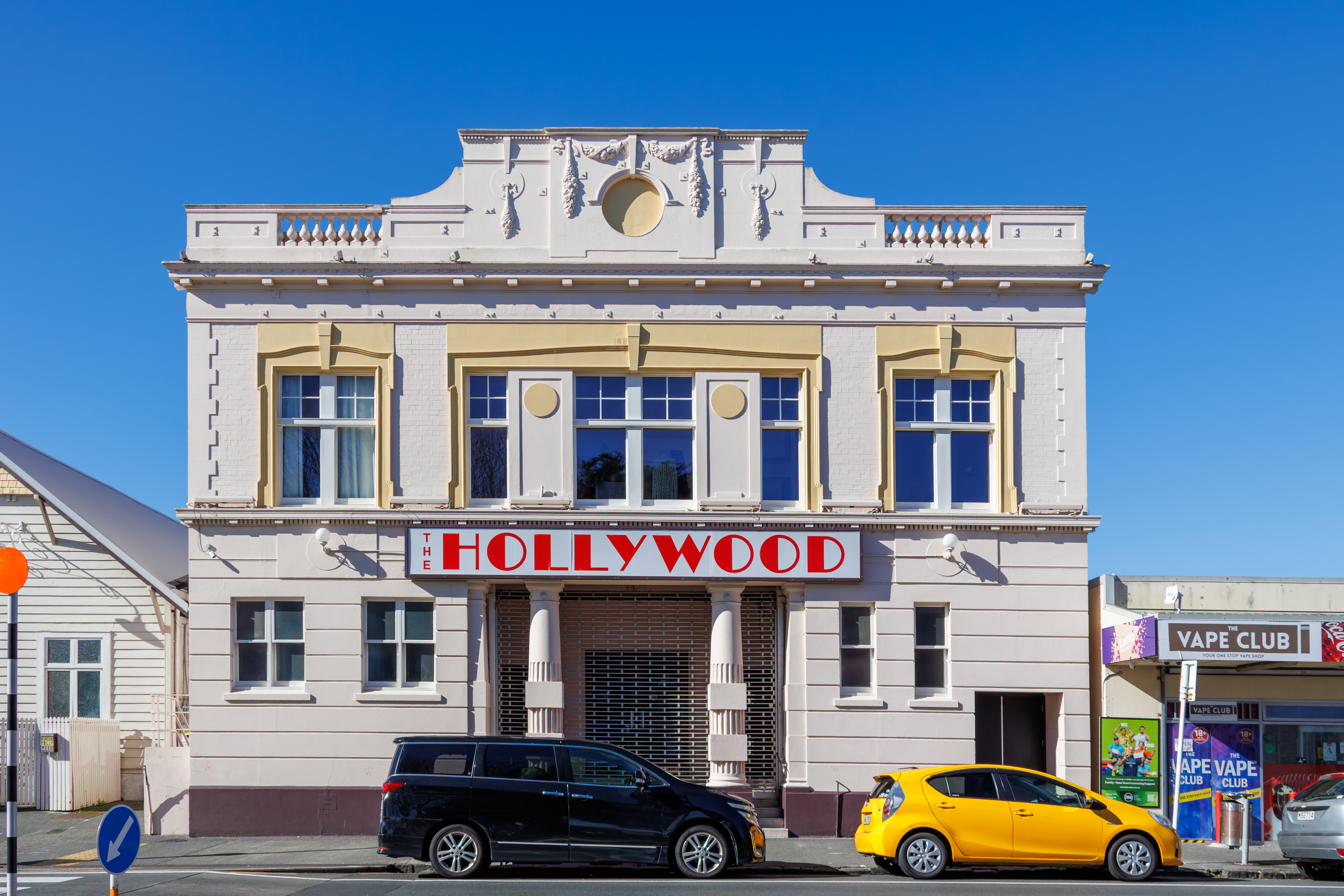
- Hollywood Cinema in 2025
- Former names: Avondale Town Hall (1915–1930); Hayward's Town Hall Pictures (1930–1946); Grosvenor Theatre (1946–1966); Hollywood Cinema (1966 – )
- Alternative names: The Hollywood, Avondale

General information
- Type: Cinema; Performing arts venue
- Location: 20 St Georges Road, Avondale, Auckland, New Zealand

Technical details
- Structural system: Auditorium with a single screen and dolby digital sound

Other information
- Seating capacity: Up to 400 (Up to 600 standing)

The Hollywood Cinema, also known as the Hollywood or the Hollywood Avondale, is a cinema and performing arts theatre in the suburb of Avondale, Auckland, New Zealand. Under different names and management, the business and the building evolved from the council-administrated Avondale Public Hall built in 1867. Following a name change and installation of a new frontage in 1915, the Hall was leased to Harry Empson, who showed movies in the venue from 1916 to August 1927 when he sold the business to Frederick William.

In 1923, the original building was moved to the adjacent lot and a new venue constructed behind the frontage. Notwithstanding the challenges of providing talkie movies and competing cinemas in neighbouring suburbs, a succession of managers, including the family of Rudall Hayward, ran the picture theatre until 1966 when the business was acquired by Jan Grefstad, who named it the Hollywood Cinema. During Grefstad's time, the Hollywood was known for the weekly midnight showings of the Rocky Horror Picture Show and the installation of a Wurlitzer Organ. After Grefstad died in 2001, the business was managed by a family trust before being sold on the open market in 2015. As of 2024 it continues to host classic, cult, revival and marathon screenings as well as selected concerts and events.

== Early history ==
The first building on the site, the Whau (later Avondale) Public Hall, officially opened on 13 November 1867. The Hall housed the local primary school for a short period, served as a library and by 1870 was being hired out to the community for entertainment and fundraising events. During the Boer War movies were shown in the Hall. In August 1900, the Edison Kinematograph Co. visited Avondale after a national tour and presented their Grand Boer War two-hour programme. The NZ Herald noted that another movie, The Patriotic Scenic Concert shown on 14 October 1901, had pictures of a royal visit to Rotorua and "comic trick and illusion films [which] mystified and amused the audience". The Auckland Star advertised that a motion picture show being presented in the Hall in 1910 by Hope's Picture Company, would be "wonderful variety, suitable for every taste with catchy music". In January 1915 the site was transferred from the Public Hall Trustees to the Avondale Road Board and the original wooden building – renamed the Avondale Town Hall – was upgraded with the addition of "an ornate brick front, complete with imposing columns, wide stairs to the entrance, and a dome on the roof".

A local, Harry Empson got permission to show pictures in the Hall on Christmas Day, 1915. In 1916, he installed new lights in the theatre and after gaining a two-year lease from the Board, showed pictures every Tuesday and Saturday evening in the Town Hall. From this point on, movies were a "fixture at the Town Hall" with Empson given permission to show motion pictures in the Town Hall for a further two years.

In 1923 the NZ Herald reported that the original wooden Town Hall was "removed from the rear of the somewhat imposing frontage to a section alongside, and in its place, it is intended to erect a new hall". When the new Hall was opened on 31 October 1924, it was described by the Auckland Star as "a handsome and capricious hall...[with]...accommodation for five hundred people".

Harry Empson continued to show movies there until August 1927 when, after some discussions with the council, he on-sold his business to Frederick William Meikle. However, with the opening of the Delta Theatre in New Lynn in 1929 and the advent of talkies Meikle struggled to meet his costs. He attempted to sell the business back to Empson in June 1930, but the deal did not go through and on 1 July, Meikle's contract with the council was terminated and taken over by Henry Hayward on 15 August.

== The Hayward years ==
Scottish-born Henry Hayward came to New Zealand in 1905. He set up Hayward's Enterprises which in 1929 amalgamated with Fuller's to form Fuller-Hayward Corporation, the distribution-exhibition company that took over the lease on the Avondale Picture Theatre. By Christmas 1930, 'talkies' were being shown in Avondale and the Town Hall had been renamed Hayward's Picture House & Cabaret and was managed by Hilda Hayward the then-wife of Henry Hayward's nephew and film-maker Rudall Hayward.

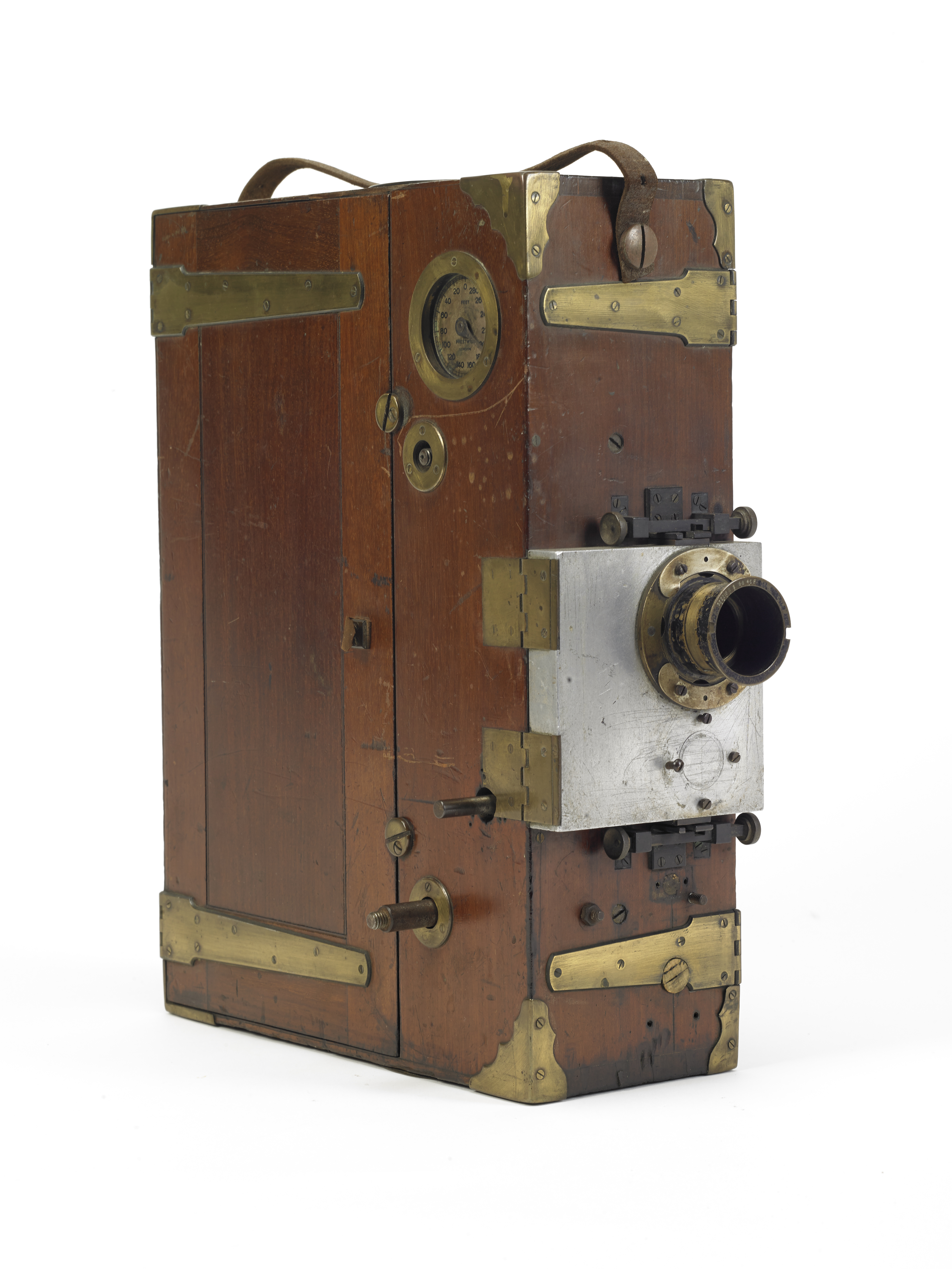
The camera used to film Rewi's Last Stand

Fuller-Hayward struggled during the Depression, and this resulted in Henry Hayward splitting and forming Auckland Cinemas Ltd., which held the lease until 1966. A fire that broke out in the Cinema on 3 June 1939, was said to have been caused by the inflammable nitrate-based stock igniting when Rudall Hayward was smoking a cigar while editing the sound version of Rewi's Last Stand. Hilda Hayward ran the theatre during the war years, from 1939 to 1945.

In 1946, the Hall became the Grosvenor Avondale with the Auckland Star reporting: "On 13th October 1947, a new company was formed called Grosvenor Theatre Ltd with a capital of $2000 divided into 1000 shares of $2. Shareholding was Auckland Cinemas Ltd with 500 shares and Rudall and Hilda (his first wife) Hayward with 250 shares each." In 1952 Auckland Cinemas Ltd. informed the Council of difficulties the company had in making a profit, partly due to the close proximity to opposition theatres in neighbouring suburbs New Lynn, Mt Albert and Point Chevalier. The lease was renewed in 1954 and the Auckland City Council, as owners of the building repainted the interior, repaired the roof and gutters [and made] "improvements to the entrance and re-upholstered the seating". In November 1955 Brian Somerville, the manager of the Cinema announced that the building was now a modern theatre with a painted ceiling, new stage, upholstered chairs, new carpet and a redesigned front entrance.

== Jan Grefstad ==
Early in 1966, Jan Grefstad formed Metropolitan Films with Ray Melrose, and they negotiated a managerial agreement with Selwyn Hayward of Auckland Cinemas Ltd to take over the Grosvenor Theatre. The agreement was confirmed, and Metropolitan Films had the right to show films to the public from 1 March 1966. The Cinema, renamed 'Hollywood', with a paint job, new carpets and lights in the foyer, had its first showing of the movie 55 Days at Peking on 11 March 1966. Auckland Cinemas officially relinquished the lease in December 1966. In February 1967, the General Manager of Paramount Films agreed to provide Metropolitan Films access to their movies. The building was transferred to private ownership for the first time on 2 September 1992, when Grefstad purchased it from the council.

Reflecting on the history of the Cinema in 1993, Grefstad said that when he took over the theatre in 1966 he had needed to show more new movies but also ran "talent contests, quiz shows and housie for the children...there was also free coffee and once he even had a chimpanzee there, courtesy of a travelling circus".

Between 1978 and 1988, the Hollywood showed the Rocky Horror Picture Show every Friday and Saturday night, beginning at 11.30 pm. When a Wurlitzer organ that had originally been in the Regent Theatre, Auckland, was damaged while in an assembly hall at Hutt Valley High School, Wellington, Grefstad agreed in 1978 that it could be housed at the Hollywood. After four years of restoration, the official opening of the organ was at a concert in the Cinema on 6 November 1982. The original console of the Wurlitzer was replaced after the Organ Trust raised $70,000 in 1998. Metro Magazine, in its feature A Guide to NZ Movie Houses in June 1991, captured the atmospherics of the theatre with: "The Hollywood has the wonderful Wurlitzer organ which fills the auditorium with sound and nostalgia and then descends, coffin-like, organist and all into a circular pit to the left of the stage."

Grefstad complained to the Commerce Commission in 1993 that the theatre may have to close because his supply of films had almost dried up and he attributed this to the distributors, Roadshow and Hoyts "squeezing him out in favour of the new Cinema 8 Complex owned by Village Force".

In March 2001, the local newspaper, the Western Leader, previewed the upcoming season of movies and entertainment in the Hollywood and noted that on the bill were classics such as Charlie Chaplin in The Tramp, Sherlock Junior starring Buster Keaton and the "legendary Douglas Fairbanks in one of his best swashbuckling roles as The Black Pirate (1926)."

Grefstad died on 8 September 2001. After attending his funeral, one commentator noted:

Just attended the farewell of a cinema friend and he would have been proud, standing room only .... it was a moving tribute to a man who has done so much for the cinema, not only in the Auckland area but throughout NZ, with Mike Clarke on the Wurlitzer a truly great send off and a good chance to meet up with cinema Industry friends not seen in a long time.

He was survived by his niece, and nephew Mark Matheson who became executor of the family's estate in 2005 and continued to run the Cinema.

== Mark Matheson (Owner 2002–2015) ==
In 2010, the Wurlitzer Organ Trust of Auckland posted an extract from a newsletter that celebrated three significant shows at the Hollywood Cinema. A commentator, after seeing the Wurlitzer played by a professional organist accompanying Charlie Chaplin's silent film, The Gold Rush in 2013, described it as a "beast of a thing...capable of all sorts of fantastic sounds – from bells to drum rolls".

The Hollywood also hosted fundraising events and in 2010, a local resident Cathy Pope decided to raise funds for an orphanage in India by showing the movie Firaaq based on families that were impacted by the 2002 Gujarat riots, in particular telling the story of one orphan named Mohsin. Because she worked in the film and television industry Pope was able to call on help for the event and several artists donated works for auctioning, with Madeleine Sami acting as MC.

Matheson assumed full interest in the estate in 2015 in order to put the business on the market, and after the property was sold, said that it was great news for the community the new owner had "innovative ideas" and intended to keep it as a cinema. Local people had previously organised a rally in support of this happening. A councillor, Ross Clow said [it was] "wonderful to see that landmark historical features such as the Hollywood Cinema are set to remain key features of the urban landscape". The Wurlitzer Organ Trust of Auckland, however, was told that because the organ was not part of the sale, it needed to be removed by 15 September 1915. Neil Warrington of the Trust said that he hoped the new owner would agree to allow them a year to relocate the organ as it would quickly deteriorate if put into storage. James Duncan, Chairperson of the Wurlitzer Trust, said they were 'gutted' when told about the September deadline and local organist John Wells said that what the Wurlitzer needed was a cinema. The organ was eventually housed in the Glen Playhouse Theatre in 2017.

== Matt Timpson (from 2015) ==
Timpson took over the Hollywood Cinema in 2015 and said he intended to keep it as a theatre with the first planned event to be an annual 24-hour Movie Marathon from November 21 to November 22.

When the cinema became a venue for the New Zealand International Film Festival (NZIFF) for the first time in 2017, Timpson said that he was "thrilled to introduce NZIFF to the Hollywood experience...[because he saw the Cinema]...as a haven for film and music lovers of Auckland, preserving the cinema-going experience and provide inspiration, education and a community-building space for locals". He also noted that the Hollywood had hosted some of NZ's finest musical talent including Tiny Ruins, Lawrence Arabia, Aldous Harding, Nadia Reid and Jean-Paul Sartre Experience.

The Hollywood developed a reputation as a music venue that maintained a cinematic atmosphere with the performances being enhanced by the effects of visuals from a 35mm movie projector. Billy Bragg played three nights there in 2018 with one reviewer commenting [it was] "rather appropriate that an artist like Billy Bragg is appearing at a venue steeped in history such as the Hollywood Theatre...[that]...has certainly seen her fair share of changes and it would seem that so has Bragg".

In 2019 the Hollywood had a special showing of the Rocky Horror Picture Show hosted by Richard O'Brien, the creator of the show, who also ran a Q&A session after the movie.

When the Hollywood hosted a screening of Cats with a 'Bring Your Own Edibles – food infused with marijuana theme', Ross Bell, executive director of the New Zealand Drug Foundation, said that while he got the humour, "the cinema was putting itself at legal risk...[because]...there is a section under the Misuse of Drugs Act that makes it an offence to knowingly allow your premises to be used for illegal drugs". Timpson responded that the night was meant to be a "safe place for people who were already going to see the film under the influence. It's become a cult thing to do so we thought we would make it a safe, communal experience with breaks and finding drivers for people afterwards", but he was not encouraging drug use and would change the wording of the promotion to make that clear.

Throughout October 2020, the Hollywood transformed into "Horrorwood" with a month-long programme of over 30 features including "exciting new films, like A24's religious horror Saint Maud, as well as cult classics, such as the original The Texas Chainsaw Massacre, and some truly bizarre oddities, à la Blood Freak".

In a Metro article in 2021 exploring the future of independent Auckland cinemas post COVID-19, Timpson did express a bleak outlook for them but concluded: "Cinema has always saved us from our troubles. It's why Hollywood still exists — the idea of Hollywood, the idea of a collective dream. It's all up there — projected for us all to connect to."

At a cost of $200,000, restorations, including re-roofing both buildings, fixing the internal gutters and a painting of the exterior, began in 2021. A local newsletter commented that it was "amazing how Matthew and the team have brought this venue back to life as a vibrant location for live events and film showings".

Timpson has stated that the Hollywood Cinema has only managed to stay open by allowing musical acts to perform there.
