= Sheria =

Seria
- village
- Country: India
- State: Haryana
- District: Jhajjar

Government
  - Type: Panchayati raj (India)
  - Body: Gram panchayat

Population (2011 Census)
  - Total: 2,624

Languages
  - Official: Hindi
- Time zone: UTC+5:30 (IST)
- PIN: 124102
- Telephone code: 01251
- ISO 3166 code: IN-HR
- Vehicle registration: HR 77
- Nearest city: Beri
- Climate: NORMAL (Köppen)
- Website: haryana.gov.in

Seria is a village in Haryana State, north of India. The village lies in the Jhajjar District on Rohtak Jhajjar road, with most of the residents having an agricultural occupation.

Seria is a large village located in Beri of Jhajjar district, Haryana with total 523 families residing. The Seria village has population of 2624 of which 1392 are males while 1232 are females as per Population Census 2011.

In Seria village the population of children with age 0-6 is 311 which makes up 11.85% of total population of village. Average Sex Ratio of Seria village is 885 which is higher than Haryana state average of 879. Child Sex Ratio for the Seria as per census is 718, lower than Haryana average of 834.

Seria village has higher literacy rate compared to Haryana. In 2011, literacy rate of Seria village was 83.01% compared to 75.55% of Haryana. In Seria Male literacy stands at 93.23% while female literacy rate was 71.78%. As per constitution of India and Panchyati Raaj Act, Seria village is administrated by Sarpanch (Head of Village) who is elected representative of village.
