= 11th (North Auckland) Mounted Rifles =

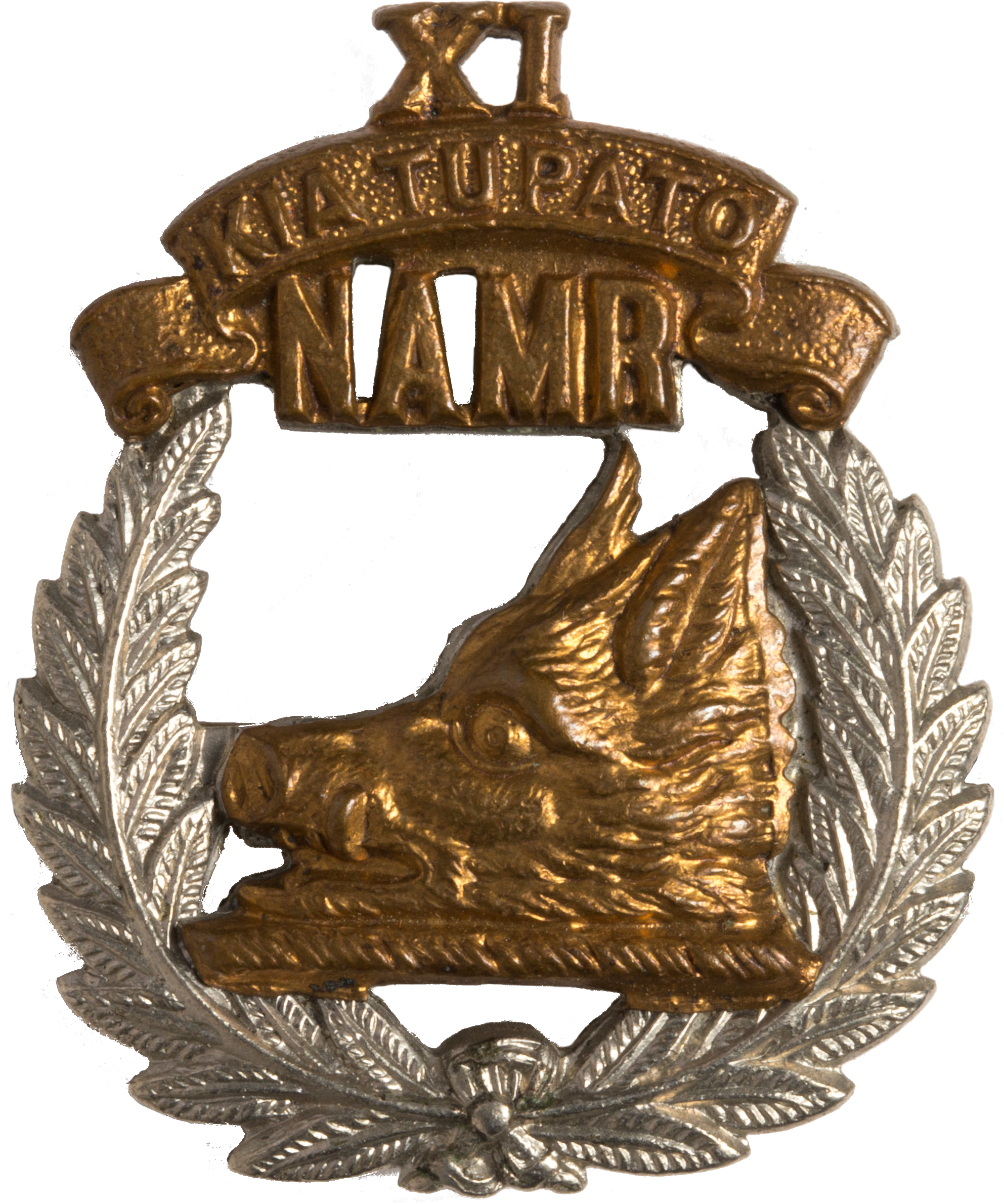
- Cap badge of the 11th (North Auckland) Mounted Rifles
- Active: 1911–1921
- Country: New Zealand
- Allegiance: New Zealand Crown
- Branch: New Zealand Army
- Role: Mounted
- Size: Regiment
- Part of: New Zealand Mounted Rifles Brigade
- Engagements: World War I

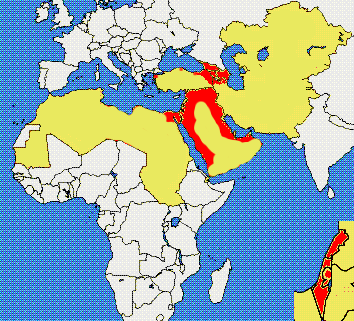
Middle Eastern Theatre during the Great War

The 11th (North Auckland) Mounted Rifles was formed on 17 March 1911. They were mobilised during World War I as a squadron of the Auckland Mounted Rifles Regiment. They served in the Middle Eastern theatre of World War I and first saw action during the Battle of Gallipoli. As a part of the larger New Zealand Mounted Rifles Brigade (of the ANZAC Mounted Division) they went on to serve in the Sinai and Palestine campaign.

== Great War Battles ==
- Battle of Gallipoli
- Battle of Romani
- Battle of Magdhaba
- Battle of Rafa
- First Battle of Gaza
- Second Battle of Gaza
- Third Battle of Gaza
- Battle of Beersheba
- Battle of Megiddo (1918)

== Between the wars ==
They became the 9th New Zealand Mounted Rifles (North Auckland) in 1921 and later was renamed the North Auckland Mounted Rifles, which was absorbed into the 1st Armoured Regiment, on 29 March 1944.

== Alliances ==
- United Kingdom – Royal Scots Greys
