= 3rd (Auckland) Mounted Rifles =

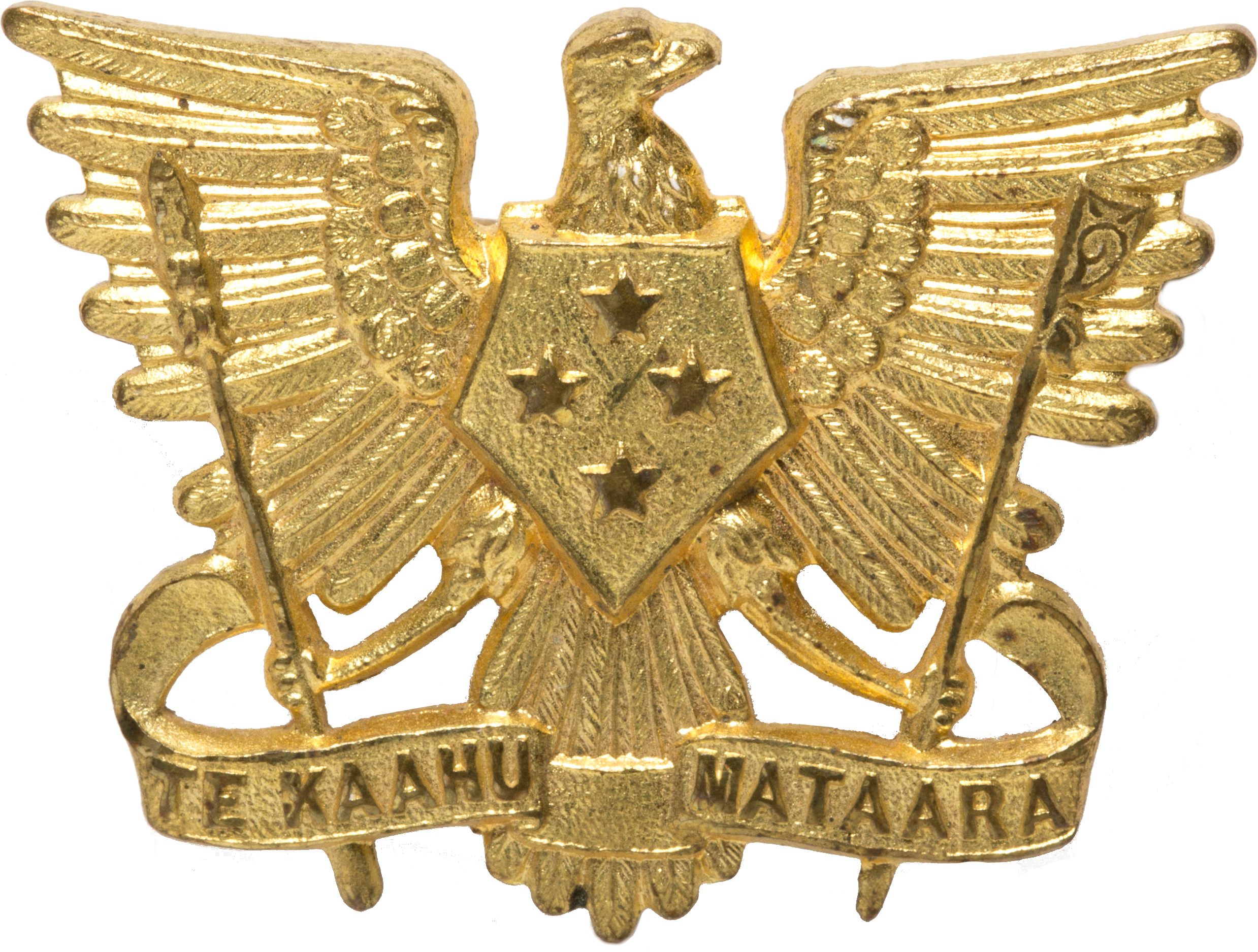
- Cap badge of the 3rd (Auckland) Mounted Rifles
- Active: 1911–1921
- Country: New Zealand
- Allegiance: New Zealand Crown
- Branch: New Zealand Army
- Role: Mounted
- Size: Regiment
- Part of: New Zealand Mounted Rifles Brigade
- Engagements: World War I

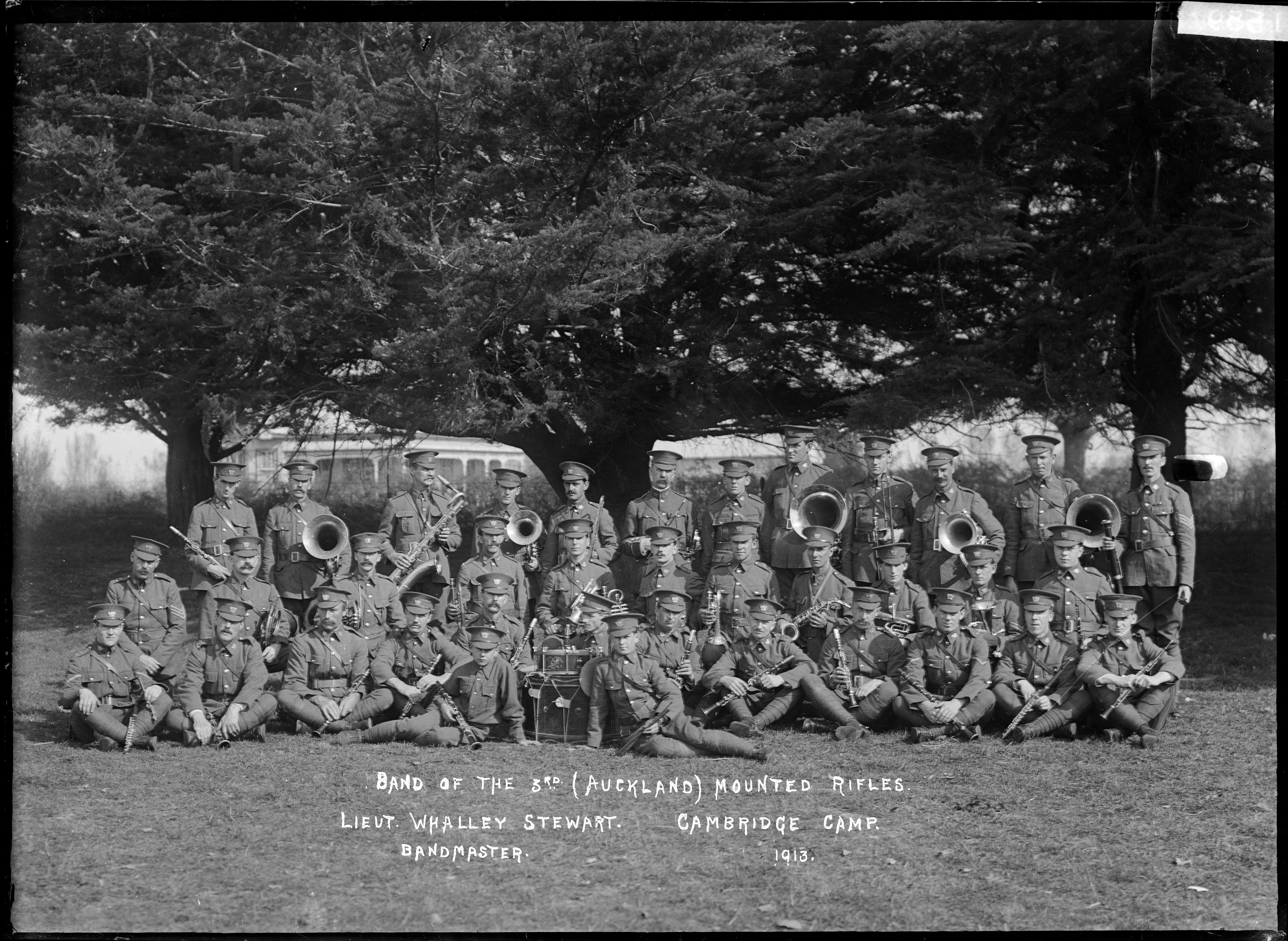
Regimental band, 1913

The 3rd (Auckland) Mounted Rifles was formed on March 17, 1911. They were mobilised during the First World War as a squadron of the Auckland Mounted Rifles Regiment. They served in the Middle Eastern theatre of World War I and first saw action during the Battle of Gallipoli. As a part of the larger New Zealand Mounted Rifles Brigade (of the ANZAC Mounted Division) they went on to serve in the Sinai and Palestine Campaign.

== Great War Battles ==
- Battle of Gallipoli
- Battle of Romani
- Battle of Magdhaba
- Battle of Rafa
- First Battle of Gaza
- Second Battle of Gaza
- Third Battle of Gaza
- Battle of Beersheba
- Battle of Megiddo (1918)

== Between the Wars ==
They were renamed the 3rd New Zealand Mounted Rifles (Auckland) in 1921. This was later changed to Auckland (East Coast) Mounted Rifles, which became part of the 1st Armoured Regiment on 29 March 1944.

== Alliances ==
- United Kingdom – 3rd The King's Own Hussars
