= Southern Palestine offensive =

Part of the Middle Eastern theatre of World War I

- Part of the Middle Eastern theatre of World War I
Date	31 October – 9 December 1917 (1 month, 1 week and 2 days)
Location	Southern Palestine from the Mediterranean coast west of Gaza to the east of Beersheba then north to Jaffa and Jerusalem
Result	Allied victory
Territorial changes	Capture of 50 miles (80 km) of Ottoman territory

Belligerents
Allied Powers: British Empire; France; Italy; Arab Revolt	Central Powers: Ottoman Empire: (German Empire) Germany (military officers)

Commanders and leaders
(United Kingdom of Great Britain and Ireland) Edmund Allenby	(German Empire) Erich von Falkenhayn (Ottoman Empire) Fevzi Pasha (German Empire) Friedrich von Kressenstein

Units involved
Egyptian Expeditionary Force: XX Corps; XXI Corps; Desert Mounted Corps	Yildirim Army Group: Seventh Army; German Asia Corps; Eighth Army

Casualties and losses
Unknown casualties	25,000 casualties

The Southern Palestine offensive, began on 31 October 1917, with the Battle of Beersheba, when the British Empire's Egyptian Expeditionary Force (EEF) under the Command of Field Marshall Edmund Allenby attacked Ottoman Empire forces at the town of Beersheba during the Sinai and Palestine Campaign, of World War I. After the capture of Beersheba, by the EEF, the Gaza to Beersheba line became increasingly weakened and, seven days later, the EEF successfully forced the Ottoman Turkish Empire's Seventh and Eighth Armies to withdraw. During the following seven days of pursuit, the Turkish forces were pushed back to Jaffa. There followed three weeks of hard fighting in the Judean Hills before Jerusalem was captured on 9 December 1917. During five and a half weeks of almost continuous offensive operations, the EEF captured 47.5 miles (76.4 km) of territory.

After a joint attack by the XX and the Desert Mounted Corps, Beersheba at the eastern end of the Gaza to Beersheba line, was captured. The next day, on 1 November, the Battle of Tel el Khuweilfe began, with an advance north of Beersheba into the Judean foothills, by the 53rd (Welsh) and the ANZAC Mounted Divisions. This move up the road from Beersheba to Jerusalem, also threatened Hebron and Bethlehem. Then, during the night of 1/2 November, the Third Battle of Gaza took place on the Mediterranean coast, when limited attacks by the XXI Corps were made against strongly held, formidable defences. The next day, the fiercely contested fighting south of Tel el Khuweilfe by the EEF was not designed to capture Hebron, but to create sufficient area for the deployment of the XX Corps, for a flank attack on the central defences of the old Gaza to Beersheba line. Fighting for the Beersheba to Jerusalem road, also encouraged the Turkish commanders to deploy their reserves, to hold the EEF threat. On 6 November the Battle of Hareira and Sheria was launched on the centre of the old line, half-way between Gaza and Beersheba, and Hareira was captured; but it was not until late the next day, that the Sheria position was finally captured by the 60th (London) Division, after a failed charge by the 4th Light Horse Brigade (Australian Mounted Division). The Seventh and the Eighth Armies were by now in full retreat from the remains of the old Gaza to Beersheba line.

On 7 November, the second day of the battle for Hareira and Sheria, the 52nd (Lowland) Division and the Imperial Service Cavalry Brigade advanced unopposed through Gaza to attack strong rearguard positions at Wadi el Hesi, which were captured the next day.

== Background ==
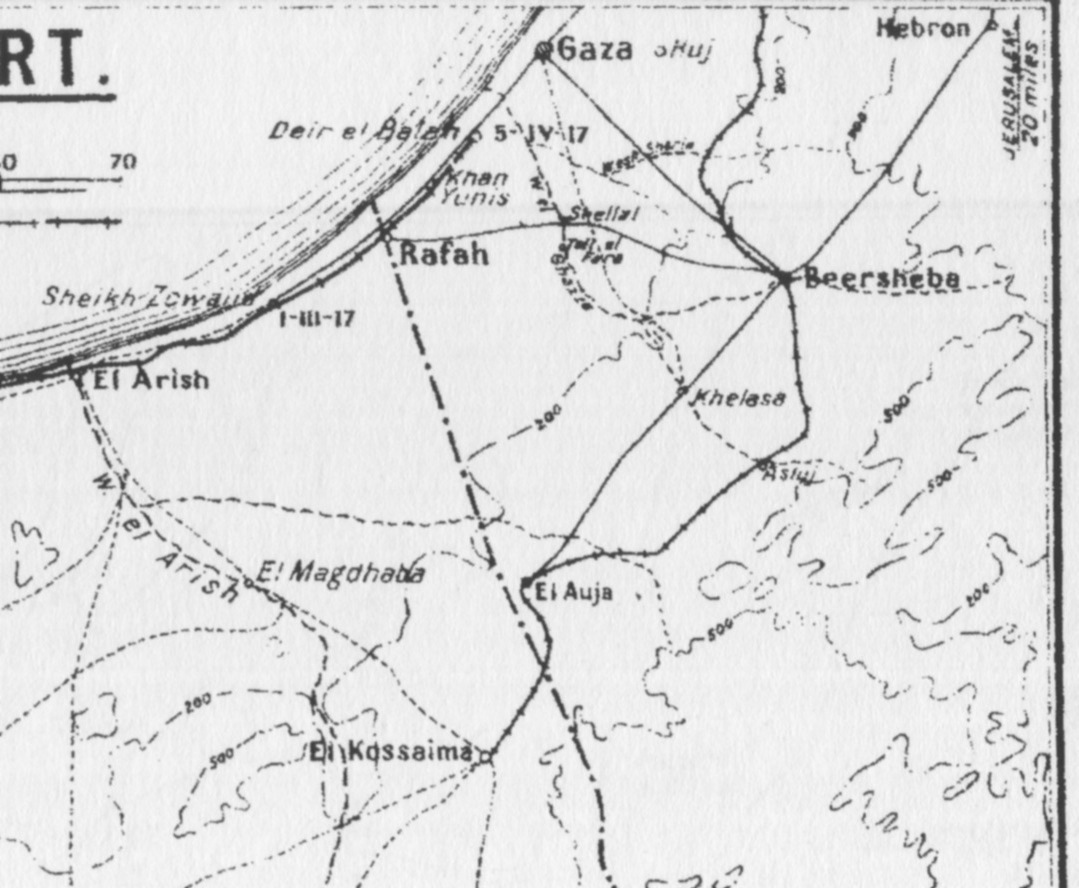
On the edge of the Eastern Desert

After the first two battles for Gaza, it was obvious to British commanders that large reinforcements were needed "to set General Murray's army in motion again." Indeed, Murray made it clear to the War Cabinet and the Imperial General Staff early in May, that he could not invade Palestine without reinforcements. The War Office assured him in the same month, that he should prepare to receive reinforcements, which would bring the Egyptian Expeditionary Force (EEF) up to six infantry and three mounted divisions. However by July, when General Edmund Allenby took command of the EEF, 5,150 infantry and 400 yeomanry reinforcements were still needed after the casualties suffered during the battles for Gaza.

By the end of the 1917 summer in the Northern Hemisphere, the political and the strategic interests of the British government and the EEF coincided. This was due in part to the failure on the Western Front of the French Republic's Nivelle offensive and the success of the German submarine campaign against British Empire shipping. The destruction of British shipping caused severe shortages in Britain, and although the United States of America had entered the war, their military support would not be apparent for some time. Britain was about to enter a fourth year of extremely costly war, and their Prime Minister, David Lloyd George, appreciated the need to take into account the "Home Front." He believed a striking military success could bolster the morale of the civil population, and he told Allenby that "he wanted Jerusalem as a Christmas present for the British nation." Lloyd Gorge made clear that this victory was needed in order "to strengthen the staying power and morale" of Britain. The British War Cabinet needed a successful Palestine offensive at a time when there was not much good news coming out of the Western Front, and when it was beginning to look like the war could extend into 1919. If they could capture Jerusalem this would put pressure on the Ottoman Empire, which could in turn place a strain on the German alliance, at the same time enhancing Britain's long term aim of strengthening their influence in the Middle East. By the end of October, the EEF was ready to attack.

The decision to launch a major offensive in Palestine, in the autumn of 1917, was also based on "very sound strategical reasons." The collapse of the Russian Empire in the spring led to the withdrawal of Russia from the war, as a consequence of the Russian Revolution, and freed up large numbers of Ottoman Empire troops, which had been fighting the Russians on the Eastern Front. These Ottoman units became available to reinforce the Palestine front and were in the process of assembling near Aleppo, along with German soldiers and equipment. They were to launch operations to recapture Baghdad, which had been captured by the British in March. The threat to Baghdad could be more economically opposed by an EEF offensive in southern Palestine. Rather than sending reinforcements to General Frederick S. Maude's Mesopotamian army holding Baghdad, British reinforcements from the Salonika front, which the War Office wanted to scale down, would strengthen the EEF.

Allenby's strategical objective was a defeat of the Ottoman army in Southern Palestine, decisive enough to ensure Ottoman reinforcements destined for Baghdad were diverted to Palestine. However, by 5 October, General William Robertson, CIGS, telegraphed Allenby that the War Cabinet desired him to eliminate the Ottoman Empire out of the war by a "heavy defeat", followed by the occupation of the Jaffa–Jerusalem line. He was to be supplied with "fresh British divisions ... at the rate of one every sixteen days." It was not until after the launching of the offensive that Allenby was told such increases to his force were improbable.

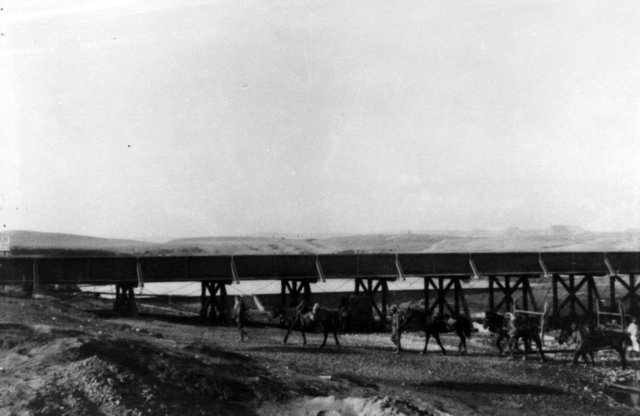
A military railway bridge over the Wadi Ghazzeh, with water storage beyond. EEF horses watered in this vicinity during September and October 1917

Allenby estimated the Ottoman Army could have 20 divisions, with no more than 12 on the front line. However, as these could be replaced by the Ottoman Army, the EEF could not field more than 14 divisions after the doubling of the railway line from Kantara, because of the limitations of the EEF's supply lines. Between April and October 1917, both the EEF and the Ottoman Army laid railways and water pipe lines, and sent troops, guns and huge quantities of ammunition to the front. By mid-October 1917, a staff appreciation from London acknowledged the strength of the Ottoman defenders in Southern Palestine, and that any attempt to dislodge them from the Gaza to Beersheba line could cost three divisions. The appreciation acknowledged that "[T]he Turk is a stubborn fighter in trenches and we must expect that in any event he will stand long enough to cause us serious loss ... we must be prepared to supply General Allenby with three more divisions" to relieve weakened divisions.

=== Battlefield ===
The Gaza to Beersheba line was defended by both sides during the Stalemate in Southern Palestine from April to the end of October 1917. The EEF front line extended for 22 miles (35 km) from the Mediterranean coast at Gaza to a point on the Wadi Ghazzeh near El Gamli, about 14 miles (23 km) south-west of Sharia and 18 miles (29 km) west of Beersheba on the southern edge of the plain of Philistia. On the coast, a strip of sand dunes varying between 2 and 4 miles (3.2 and 6.4 km) wide was impassable for wheeled vehicles. Between the sand dunes and the Judean Hills, which rise to 3,000 feet (910 m), the mainly undulating "down-land" plains stretched between 15 and 20 miles (24 and 32 km) wide. The plains were intersected by many wadis, which transformed into "raging torrents," rushing down from the bare rocky Judaean Mountains during the wet winters. The region was sparsely populated, with each village depending on its well for water, while crops of barley were grown. From this area, the topographical conditions of the plain are unchanged for 80 miles (130 km) northwards, becoming the Plain of Sharon from Jaffa, to finally end at Mount Carmel near Haifa.

== Prelude ==
The Ottoman Army in Palestine commanded by Marshal Erich von Falkenhayn was nearly 50,000 strong, while General Allenby’s EEF was 76,000 strong.

=== Defending force ===
Until June 1917, Sheria was the headquarters of the German-commanded defenders holding the Gaza-Beersheba line. In August 1917, the Fourth Army was structured as:

- Fourth Army (Syria-Palestine)
    - 3rd Cavalry Division
  - VIII Corps
    - 48th Division
  - XII Corps
    - 23rd Division
    - 44th Division
  - XV Corps
    - 43rd Division
  - XX Corps
    - 16th Division
    - 54th Division
  - XXII Corps
    - 3rd Division
    - 7th Division
    - 53rd Division

The Fourth Army in Palestine was reorganised into two corps, the XX Corps was expanded from the 16th and 54th Infantry Divisions to include the 178th Infantry Regiment and the 3rd Cavalry Division, while the XXII Corps' three divisions remained unchanged. The XX Corps was headquartered at Huj, while the XXII Corps defended Gaza with the 3rd and 53rd Divisions. By July the Eighth Army commanded by Friedrich Freiherr Kress von Kressenstein consisting of six infantry divisions and one cavalry division, had an estimated strength of 46,000 rifles, 28,000 sabres and 200 guns.

==== Yildirim Army Group ====
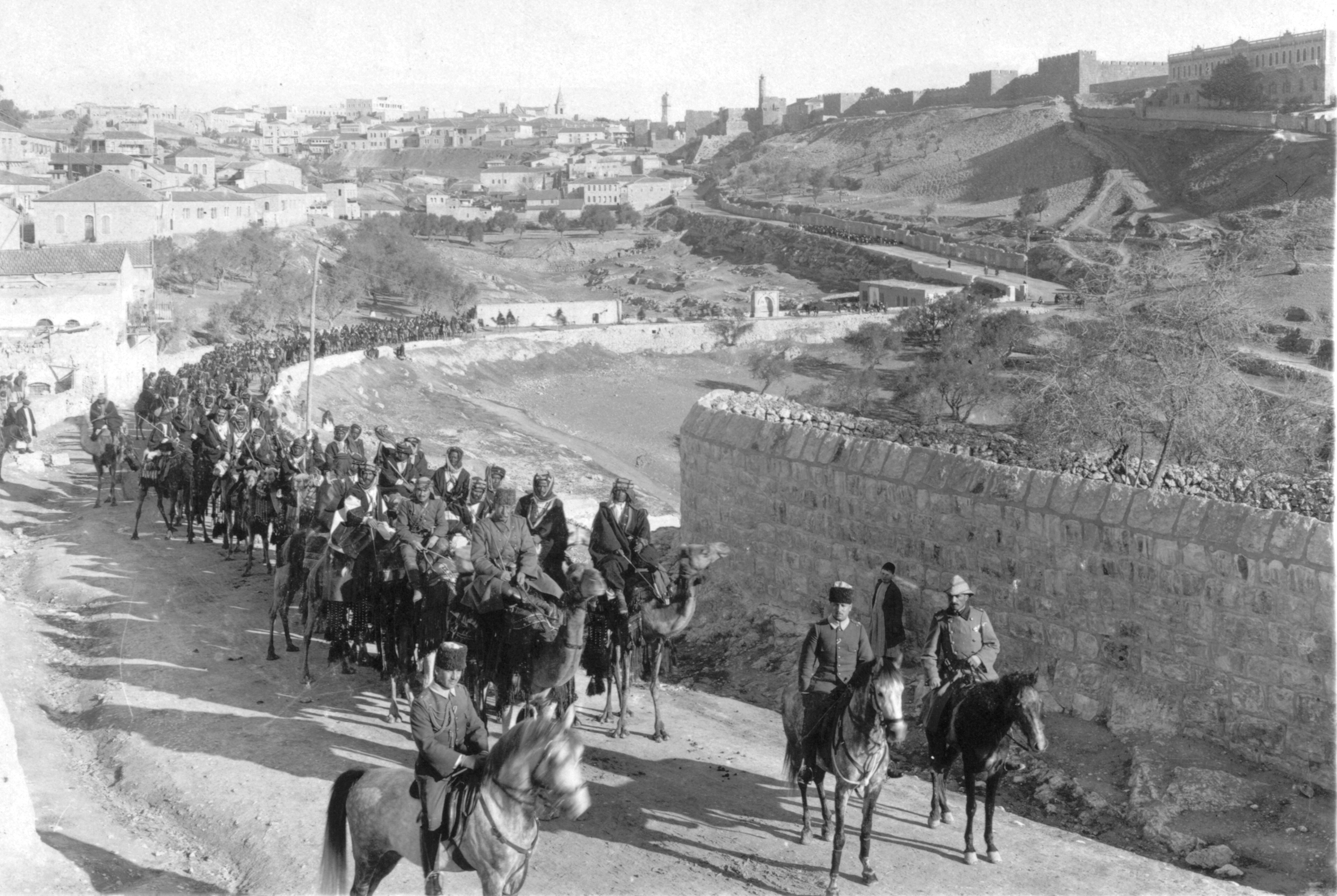
Ottoman Arab Camel Corps

Germany had suggested that six or seven Ottoman divisions released as a consequence of the Russian Army's withdrawal from the war, should attack Mesopotamia with German support. Germany would supply ammunition, equipment, troops and gold along with one of Germany's "most distinguished soldiers", Erich von Falkenhayn, and an Army Headquarters staff. These German reinforcements included the German Asia Corps, three battalion groups of "handpicked and thoroughly trained" infantry, very strongly supported by artillery, machine guns, mortars, aircraft and mechanical transport. The Ottoman Empire would contribute a new Seventh Army made up of divisions transferred from the Caucasus and the Balkan fronts.

Following the formation of the Yildirim Army Group in June 1917, substantial forces were deployed to Syria and Palestine, where they continued to hold the Fourth Army defences. Already in Palestine were the 3rd, 7th, 16th, and 54th Infantry Divisions while the 26th 27th, and 53rd Infantry Divisions arrived during the summer. The 3rd, 7th 16th, and 26th Infantry Divisions had fought in the Gallipoli campaign and the 3rd Cavalry Division had fought in the Caucasian Campaigns. These seven infantry divisions and one cavalry division formed the recently activated Ottoman Eighth Army.

On establishment, the Yildirim Army Group consisted of Ottoman Army troops already in Palestine and Mesopotamia. These included the 19th and the 20th Divisions from Galicia, the 24th and the 42nd Divisions from the Dardanelles, the 48th Division from the Caucasus, the 50th Division from Macedonia and the 59th from Adana in the Gulf of Iskanderun. The 1st and 11th Divisions were also transferred from the Caucasus to the Yildirim Army Group, arriving in time for the attempt to retake Jerusalem at the end of December, and in March 1918 respectively. (Note: While the 19th and 24th Divisions arrived before the battles for the Gaza to Beersheba line, the 20th Division arrived in time for the defence of Jerusalem, the 48th Division arrived soon after the loss of Jerusalem. The 42nd Division did not reach Syria until the summer of 1918, and the 50th and 59th Divisions were disbanded possibly in Aleppo and the troops sent to Mesopotamia and Palestine as reinforcements. [Falls 1930 Vol. 2, p. 24])

In August 1917, the Yildirim Army Group consisted of:

- Seventh Army, Syria (Mirliva Mustafa Kemal Atatürk)
  - III Corps
    - 24th Division (3,200 rifles)
  - XV Corps
    - 19th Division (est. 4,000 rifles)
    - 20th Division
  - German Asia Corps
- Sixth Army, Mesopotamia (Mirliva Halil Kut)
  - XIII Corps
    - 2nd Division
    - 6th Division
  - XVIII Corps
    - 14th Division
    - 51st Division
    - 52nd Division
  - 46th Division
- 42nd Division
- 48th Division
  - XX Corps at Huj
    - 16th Division (3,789 rifles)
    - 54th Division (2,738 rifles)
    - 178th Infantry Regiment
    - 3rd Cavalry Division
  - XXII Corps at Gaza
    - 3rd Division (3,698 rifles)
    - 7th Division (2,886 rifles)
    - 53rd Division (3,100 rifles)
- 26th Division (2,901 rifles)
- 27th Division (2,408 rifles 76% Arab)
- 12th Depot Regiment (2,336 rifles 97% Arab)
- 136th Regiment (1,011 rifles)

The total infantry "rifle strengths" for the 12 units on 30 September was 28,067 plus the 19th Division's 4,000 giving a total of 32,067 rifles supported by 268 guns. The two 3rd Cavalry Division regiments in the area had 1,400 sabres, while the third regiment of the division was deployed east of the Jordan River. These rifle figures at 30 September overlook the 25% of rifles of each infantry battalion, which were progressively replaced with machine guns, beginning on 10 August 1917.

By mid-September 1917 the Ottoman Army had decided against the attempt to retake Baghdad. Enver Pasha took von Falkenhayn's advice to send the Yildirim Army Group to Palestine, to face the growing threat reported by Kress von Kressenstein. Enver Pasha issued orders on 26 September for the Fourth Army headquarters to move to Damascus, at the same time dividing the area in half, leaving Cemal Pasha with responsibility for Syria and western Arabia. On 2 October, Enver Pasha activated the new Eighth Army, commanded by Kress von Kressenstein, and deployed it along with the Seventh Army, commanded by Mustafa Kemal, to the Yildirim Army Group, commanded by von Falkenhayn. However, in late September Mustafa Kemal disagreed with some of Enver Pasha's decisions and the new command structure. He advised adopting a defensive military policy, in response to the superior British lines of communications, which would ensure continued numerical superiority in any contested theatre. He thought this imbalance would make it impossible for the Yildirim Army Group to go on the offensive. He advised merging the Seventh and the Eighth Armies, offering to step down in favour of Kress von Kressenstein. Several weeks later Mustafa Kemal resigned and Fevzi Pasa took command of the Seventh Army which was still assembling near Aleppo. By October 1917 the headquarters of the Eighth Army commanded by Kress von Keressenstein was at Huleikat to north of Huj.

These massive reorganisations began to be implemented in October, but by the end of the month, only the headquarters of the Seventh and Eighth Armies were in position to take the field. On 1 October, the Eighth Army consisted of 2,894 officers, 69,709 men, 29,116 rifles, 403 machine guns, 268 artillery pieces, and 27,575 animals. Between 10 and 28 October 1917, the Eighth Army shifted three infantry divisions to reserve positions, although the defence of Beersheba remained the responsibility of the Ottoman III Corps, consisting of the mainly Arab 27th Infantry Division, and the 2nd Infantry Regiment "minus its machine guns," with the two regiments of the 3rd Cavalry Division.

On 28 October, orders were issued by von Falkenhayn's Yildirim Army Group headquarters, directing Kress von Kressenstein's Eighth Army to assume responsibility for the western, or Gaza half, of the Ottoman front line, while Fevzi Pasa's Seventh Army took responsibility for the eastern half including Beersheba. The III Corps headquarters which commanded the 27th Infantry Division and the 3rd Cavalry Division was transferred from the Eighth to the Seventh Army. The 16th and 24th Infantry Divisions and the 19th Infantry Division on its way south were also assigned to the Seventh Army. Both the 19th and 24th Divisions arrived before the battle began. Kress von Kressenstein later described the 27th Infantry Division defending Beersheba, as 'badly trained, badly organised, and composed of Arabs who had to be watched'. He recommended the division be deactivated and its soldiers deployed elsewhere as reinforcements. He suggested the 19th Infantry Division, Mustafa Kemal's "famous Gallipoli division," replace it at Beersheba. Regarded by the Ottoman General Staff as the most powerful infantry division in the Ottoman Army's order of battle, the 19th Division which had also served in Galicia, had an unusually powerful artillery component. The commander of the Yildirim Army Group, von Falkenhayn, ordered the 19th Infantry Division moved into reserve near Cemame [Jemame?] nearer to Gaza than Beersheba.

By 31 October, nine Ottoman infantry divisions and one cavalry division with a total strength of up to 45,000 rifles, 1,500 sabres and 300 guns defended the Gaza to Beersheba line. Gaza was defended by the Eighth Army's XXII Corps, with its XX Corps defending Sheria, while the Seventh Army's III Corps defended Beersheba. The recently arrived commander of the Seventh Army, Fevzi Pasha, "played no active role in command during the early stages of the third battle of Gaza and the entire front remained under Kress's control."

==== Assault battalions ====
Each infantry division was reorganised into three infantry regiments, each consisting of three infantry battalions, and one assault battalion. The specialised assault or storm troop divisions of the German Army were never formed by the Ottoman Army. However, the assault battalions were established by order of Enver Pasha on 1 September 1917, during a general activation of Stoßtruppen style assault troops, across the whole Ottoman Army. The XV Corps, the First Army and the Fourth Army established the 1st, 2nd, and 3rd Assault Battalions respectively. In addition, Enver Pasha ordered each infantry division in the Yildirim Army Group and in the Fourth Army, to establish assault detachments consisting of the best officers, NCOs, and men from the best units in the division. These soldiers were required to be 27 years old or younger, intelligent, healthy and strong. Each assault unit was given a one-month assault course, better rations, and a badge embroidered with a hand grenade.

==== Aircraft ====
During October, 56 aircraft in Nos. 301, 302, 303 and 304 Squadrons of the German Flying Corps, arrived in Palestine from Germany. At the time No. 14 (Ottoman) Squadron's A.E.G. two-seaters, were stationed at Kutrani.

==== Characteristics ====
It has also been claimed that after "Russia's collapse in 1917" that reinforcements needed in Palestine were sent to the Caucasus, leaving the Ottoman army low in morale. In describing the situation, Hughes writes that "many had received no mail from home in years. The hapless Turkish recruits awaited the EEF assault in 'fragile tents' with 'nothing to cheer their spirits'." This was because "the condition of the Ottoman railway system was such that the Turks had difficulty maintaining any substantial force in Palestine either for defensive or offensive operations." Based on a single track for 1,275 miles, with sections of standard and narrow gauge, the Ottoman lines of communication have been described as "appalling."

The Ottoman Army in Palestine in 1917 continued to demonstrate most of the characteristics they had during the first two years of war. The army was operationally and tactically aggressive, executing both defensive and offensive operations and training continuously in realistic, up-to-date methods at troop level and in centralised settings. According to Erickson, "[d]ivisions were task-organised" for a variety of "specific tactical missions." The commanders were experienced, highly trained and capable leaders who "continued to function well in its third year of a multi-front total war."

However, it has also been claimed that the Ottoman front line infantry battalions were "operating at about half strength." The 21st Infantry Regiment on 26 October, according to the Turkish General Staff Archives was claimed to be "at half strength in trained men" and reinforcements were failing to keep up with "sick and battle casualties." Their last battle had been a decisive victory seven months previous, in April, from behind strong fortifications. Captain Hüseyin Hüsnü Emir, Assistant Chief of Staff of the Yildirim Army Group, claimed the 16th Division which had 200 officers, 400 NCOs and 10,900 men in September 1916, had been reduced to only 5,017 officers and men by 15 October 1917. Then the "three infantry battalions in its 78th Infantry Regiment numbered about 400 men each (out of an authorisation of about 750 men per battalion)." He also claimed that every division in the Gaza defences was below strength by 50 per cent, but there is no mention of the establishment of assault battalions. In addition, chronic failures due to casualties and manpower shortages, were reported as being "compounded by terrible attrition from disease and desertion." On 3 August 1917, the Yildirim Army Group reported "a deficit of some 70,000 soldiers", and that even the proposed reinforcements would leave them 40,000 short. According to Hussein Husni's Yilderim, "in September 1917 Mustafa Kemal, the commander of the Seventh army in Palestine, reported to Enver Pasha that 50 per cent of the arriving 54th division were either too young or old; [no source] a battalion of one of the best divisions left Istanbul 1,000 strong, only to arrive at Aleppo with 500 men. [note 76 Hussein Husni, Yilderim, Part 1, Chapter 4 (also appendix 16).] "

According to Massey, rations and leadership amongst the divisions facing the British Empire troops were also poor, writing "if the...[Ottoman Army]...had been well led and properly rationed," the Ottoman 3rd, 7th, 16th, 19th, 20th, 24th, 26th, 27th, 53rd, and 54th Divisions and the 3rd Cavalry Division, should have been able to resist more strongly.

==== Gaza-Beersheba line ====
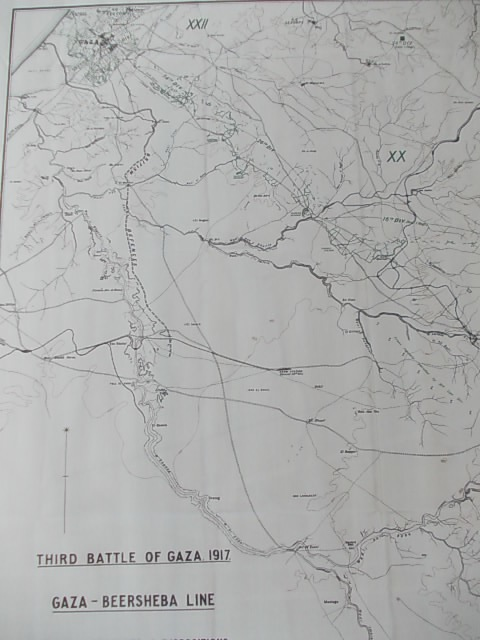
Western section of the Gaza–Beersheba Line

After April, the defences at Gaza had been strengthened. Many of the houses were built on a ridge, each with its own garden surrounded by high cactus hedges, enclosing an area at least 1 mile (1.6 km) deep. Along with this formidable area the 12,000 yards (11,000 m) of trenching west of the town needed to be attacked by infantry as Allenby did not have enough artillery to do the job. Both Sheria and Beersheba were particularly strongly fortified by the Ottoman force, permanent strongly entrenched and wired positions were constructed from the sea at Gaza to Shellal on the Wadi Ghazzeh, defended by infantry. An Ottoman appreciation stated that due to lack of water any attack on Beersheba could only be made by one cavalry and one infantry division. (Note: Based on an 11 November 1917 report by Major Pardoe titled "Turkish Machine Gun Defences and Emplacements" it has been claimed "Gaza's defences were so weak that Allenby should have concentrated his cavalry opposite Gaza and made his main attack there, and ignored or, at most, launched a diversionary attack on Beersheba." [Hughes 1999, p. 50])

The well-sited Ottoman defences relied on entrenched Ottoman soldiers ready to take every opportunity to counterattack. Both Gaza and Beersheba were virtually ringed by fortifications. An attack was expected by the EEF and the Ottoman Army knew about EEF preparations for an attack.

The strength of the Yildirim Army Group units holding the Gaza to Beersheba line was estimated at 40,000 rifles, although the figure was later found to be closer to 33,000 rifles, 1,400 sabres and 260 guns, including the reserve 19th Division at 'Iraq el Menshiye, and the 12th Depot Regiment at Hebron. (Note: These figures do not mention machine guns. [Falls 1930 Vol. 2, p. 35]) While both Sheria and Beersheba were particularly strongly fortified by the Ottoman defenders, there were permanent strongly entrenched and wired positions stretching from the sea at Gaza to Shellal on the Wadi Ghazzeh.

On 31 October, the defenders of the Gaza to Beersheba line had been increased to nine divisions and one cavalry division. The Yildirim Army Group's pre–battle deployment saw the Gaza–Beersheba line held by two field armies "abreast." On the right, the Eighth Army with headquarters at Huleikat north of Huj deployed,

XXII Corps commanded by Refet Bey with headquarters at Jebaliye holding the strongly fortified positions around Gaza with the 3rd, 53rd Divisions
XX Corps commanded by Ali Fuad Bey with headquarters at Huj held Sheria with the 16th, 26th, 54th Divisions, holding the line eastwards with the 26th and 54th Divisions
Army Reserve at Deir Sneid the 7th Division and the 19th Division, which was either at Iraq el Menshiye 25 miles (40 km) north of beersheba and 19 miles (31 km) north–east of Gaza, or at an assembly area 20 kilometres (12 mi) behind the front.

Gaza had been developed into a strong fortress, heavily entrenched and wired. Stretching from the Mediterranean Sea on either side of Gaza a series of strong groups of positions at Sihan, Atawineh, Abu Hariera-Arab el Teeaha and Beersheba, ran eastwards for 30 miles (48 km) to a point south of Sharia. Extending across the railway, these groups of defensive positions had "every advantage of observation over the long bare slopes which an attacker must cross." Beyond these main positions there was a gap of about 8 miles (13 km) to the defences at Beersheba where the desert country, minimized the threat of an EEF attack. However strong defences had been developed to the west and south–west of Beersheba with a garrison from the Seventh Army of 5,000 protecting its important wells, supported by a number of high entrenched hills around Beersheba.

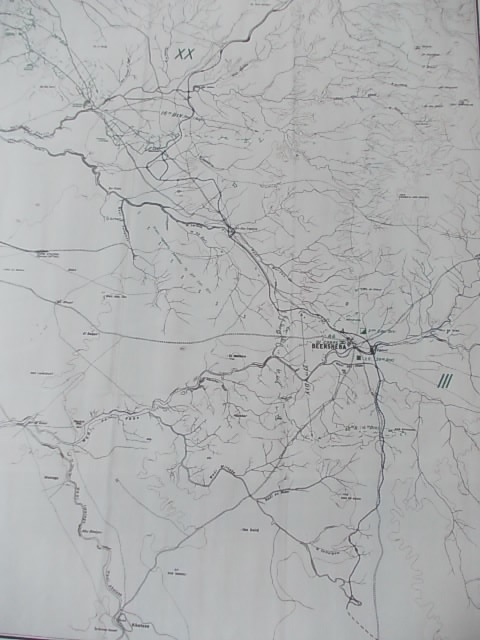
Beersheba end of the Gaza–Beersheba Line

The Seventh Army on the left, commanded by Fevzi Pasha was deployed –

III Corps at Kauwukah or in XX Corps reserve near Kh. Jemmame east of Huj (24th Division) at Beersheba (27th, 16th Divisions, 3rd Cavalry Division) also at Beersheba.

Beersheba was defended by the Ottoman 27th Division, reinforced by battalions from the 16th and 24th Divisions. Here, the fortifications consisted of two lines of defensive positions. The outer line circled the town from the Gaza to Beersheba road where the line passed through the high ground to the north–west of Beersheba before continuing to the west and south–west of Beersheba, to Ras Ghannam. Situated on average about 7,000 yards (6,400 m) from Beersheba, this semi–circle of defences was heavily entrenched and wired. To the north–east, east and south–east the outer line of defences consisted of a series redoubts or strong posts on the high ground at Tel el Sakaty and Tel el Saba, along with two stone block–houses defending the north bank of the Wadi Saba. The second inner line of defences completely encircled Beersheba the town itself, crossing the Wadi Saba just to the south of the railway bridge. Before the battle, Kress von Kressenstein recommended that the wells at Beersheba be destroyed and the garrison withdrawn to the hills north of the town, because he considered there were not enough troops to successfully defend Beersheba. He argued that from the hills to the north, the Beersheba garrison could attack the flank of any EEF units moving against Hareira and Sheria, but von Falkenhayn rejected this advice.

=== Attacking force ===
The EEF had been reorganized and strengthened during the Stalemate in Southern Palestine to overcome the strongly reinforced and entrenched Ottoman forces holding the Gaza to Beersheba line. Allenby was directed by the War Cabinet to "strike the Turks as hard as possible," and defeat hostile forces wherever they opposed the EEF. He was to commence the offensive as "early as possible in September" before the Ottoman Army could redeploy their forces after the withdrawal of Russia from the war. Robertson assured Allenby was assured that "everything possible" was being done to bring the EEF back to full strength and fully supplied with munitions. However there was "no prospect at present of being able to send you the further reinforcements ... required for operations beyond the line Jaffa–Jerusalem." By this time the EEF was competing for finite British resources, which were being restricted by the very successful German submarine attacks which destroyed British ships and supplies, with the Third Battle of Ypres which had commenced on 31 July. However, more artillery was in transit, and the doubling of the railway had been authorised on 21 July.

The fighting strength of the EEF was 100,189:

Desert Mounted Corps 745 officers, 17,935 other ranks in the Anzac, Australian and Yeomanry Mounted Divisions
XX Corps 1,435 officers, 44,171 other ranks in the 10th, 53rd, 60th and 74th Divisions
XXI Corps 1,154 officers, 34,759 other ranks in the 52nd, 54th and 75th Divisions. The force consisted of:

XX Corps (Lieutenant General Sir R.W. Chetwode, Bart.)

10th (Irish) Division (Major General J.R. Longley) (Note: Nominally Army Troops. [Keogh, p. 135])

29th Brigade
30th Brigade
31st Brigade

53rd (Welsh) Division (Major General S.F. Mott)

158th (North Wales) Brigade
159th (Cheshire) Brigade
160th (Welsh Border) Brigade

60th (2/2nd London) Division (Major General J.S.M. Shea)

179th (2/4th London) Brigade
180th (2/5th London) Brigade
181st (2/6th London) Brigade

74th (Yeomanry) Division (Major General E.S. Girdwood)

229th Brigade
230th Brigade
231st Brigade

Corps Cavalry Regiment – 1/2nd County of London Yeomanry
Corps Artillery – 96th Heavy Artillery Group

XXI Corps (Lieutenant General Sir E.S. Bulfin)

52nd (Lowland) Division (Major General J. Hill)

155th (South Scottish) Brigade
156th (Scottish Rifles) Brigade
157th (Highland Light Infantry) Brigade

54th (East Anglian) Division (Major General S.W. Hare)

161st (Essex) Brigade
162nd (East Midland) Brigade
163rd (Norfolk and Suffolk) Brigade

75th Division(Major General P.C. Palin)

232nd Brigade
233rd Brigade
234th Brigade

Corps Cavalry Regiment – Composite Yeomanry Regt.
Corps Artillery – 97th, 100th, 102nd Heavy Artillery Groups
20th Indian Brigade (Brigadier General H.D. Watson)

Desert Mounted Corps (Lieutenant General Sir H. Chauvel)

Anzac Mounted Division (Major General E.W.C. Chaytor)

1st Light Horse Brigade (Brigadier General C. F. Cox)
2nd Light Horse Brigade (Brigadier General G. de L. Ryrie)
New Zealand Mounted Rifle Brigade (Brigadier General W. Meldrum)
XVIII Brigade RHA (Inverness-shire, Ayrshire and Somerset Batteries) of 13–pounder guns and Divisional Ammunition Column

Australian Mounted Division (Major General Henry W. Hodgson)

3rd Light Horse Brigade (Brigadier General L. C. Wilson)
4th Light Horse Brigade (Brigadier General W. Grant)
5th Mounted Brigade (Brigadier Generals Percy Desmond FitzGerald/P. J. V. Kelly)
XIX Brigade RHA (1/A and 1/B Batteries HAC and 1/1st Nottinghamshire RHA) of 13–pounder guns and Divisional Ammunition Column

Yeomanry Mounted Division (Major General G. de S. Barrow)

6th Mounted Brigade (Brigadier General C. A. C. Godwin)
8th Mounted Brigade (Brigadier General C. S. Rome)
22nd Mounted Brigade (Brigadier General P. D. FitzGerald)
XX Brigade RHA (Berkshire, Hampshire and Leicestershire Batteries) of 13–pounder guns and Divisional Ammunition Column

Corps Reserve

7th Mounted Brigade (Brigadier General J. T. Wigan)

Essex Battery RHA and Brigade Ammunition Column

Imperial Camel Corps Brigade (Brigadier General C. L. Smith)

Hong Kong and Singapore Camel Battery RGA. The artillery of Desert Mounted Corps was downgraded in mid September from 18-pounder to 13-pounder guns, which Erickson characterised as becoming "even more capable."

General Headquarters Troops

Army Cavalry

Imperial Service Cavalry Brigade (Major (temp. Brigadier General M. H. Henderson)

Kathiwar Signal Troop
124th Indian Cavalry Field Ambulance. The XXI Corps' Composite Force of almost a division, consisting of the 25th Indian Infantry Brigade, a West Indian battalion, the French Détachement français de Palestine and the Italian Distaccamento italiano di Palestina, was camped east of the 75th Division in the region of Sheikh Abbas.

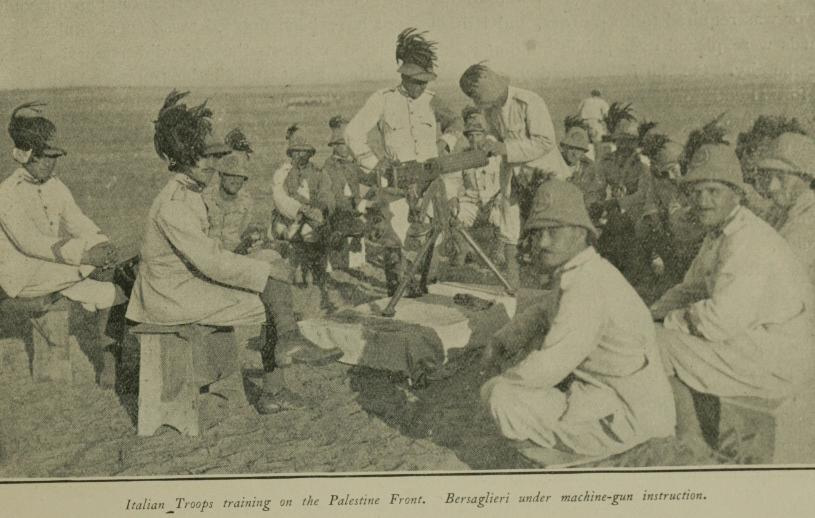
Italian Bersaglieri with a machine-gun instructor in Palestine

Altogether, the EEF comprised 200,000 men (including Arab workers), 46,000 horses, 20,000 camels, more than 15,000 mules and donkeys, and hundreds of artillery pieces. The official rifle strength of the EEF on 28 October 1917, was 80,000 in the infantry divisions and the Imperial Camel Brigade, and 15,000 cavalry including the mounted rifles and mounted infantry brigades. (Note: Half the brigades in Desert Mounted Corps were light horse and mounted rifle brigades armed only with rifle and bayonet. [Keogh, pp. 125–6]) However the "actual strength ... [was] about 60,000 and 12,000 respectively." This represented a comparable ratio of 2:1 infantry, 8:1 cavalry and about 3:2 guns. (Note: It has been claimed that the EEF had 17,000 sabres while the Ottoman cavalry had 1,500. [Young 1986, pp. 2390–1] The numbers of machine guns have not been included by the sources.)

Most of Allenby's infantry were Territorial divisions, mobilised at the outbreak of the war with most, if not all the battalions having some regular army officers and NCOs. A number of the divisions had fought against the Ottoman Army, during the Gallipoli Campaign. The 52nd (Lowland) Division at Cape Helles, while the 53rd (Welsh) Division and the 54th (East Anglian) Division fought at Suvla Bay, while the 60th (2nd/2nd London) Division had fought on the western front and at Salonika. The 74th (Yeomanry) Division recently formed from was 18 under–strength Yeomanry regiments had all fought dismounted at Gallipoli. The 10th (Irish) Division, a New Army (K1) division had also fought at Suvla Bay and at Salonika. All three of the brigades of the Anzac Mounted Division and the two light horse brigades of the Australian Mounted Division had fought the Ottoman Army on Gallipoli. (Note: Erickson overlooks the Sinai and Palestine campaign. The 52nd (Lowland) Division fought at the Romani on the Sinai peninsula and the First and the Second Battle of Gaza, the 53rd (Welsh) Division, along with the 54th (East Anglian) Division fought at the First and the Second Battles of Gaza, while the Anzac Mounted Division fought at Romani, Magdhaba, Rafa, the First and Second Battle of Gaza.)

Allenby agreed that he would take the offensive as soon as arrangements were complete and he had seven infantry divisions ready for action. During October Allenby was waiting "for reinforcements from England." On 17 October Allenby wrote to Robertson that the 75th Division was complete but the 10th (Irish) Division had about 3,000 cases of fever and lacked its "B" echelon of its Divisional Ammunition Column. He was hopeful that the Irish division would be complete and able to field between 8,000 and 9,000 rifles "on the day." In addition Allenby had been in close touch with the naval captains, while waiting for reinforcements, to ensure they had personally reconnoitred their sea and land so they "know exactly what to do."

==== Aircraft ====
The Army Wing aircraft were assigned to carry out strategic reconnaissances, to report on Ottoman reserves well behind their lines, and carry out photography duties and air raids. Army fighter squadron was to provide protection from hostile air attack, while the Army bombing squadron was prepared to conduct bombing air raids. The Corps Squadrons of aircraft attached to the two infantry corps, carried out artillery and contact patrols, along with tactical reconnaissance. Photography of the opposition's trenches was normally carried out daily by the Army Wing. One flight of aircraft attached to XX Corps, was responsible for carrying out artillery and contact patrols and tactical reconnaissances for Desert Mounted Corps.

As well as the arrival of British troops, all types of war material along with heavy guns, motor transport, up-to-date fast aircraft replaced the slow aircraft, which had been outpaced by the German Fokker and Albatross Scout aircraft. The first of the new R.E.8s arrived at No. 1 Squadron on 17 October along with new Martinsydes, fitted with a 160-hp engine instead of the old 120-hp engines. As a result, control of the air gradually moved to the EEF from the Ottoman Army, which had held it since the Sinai campaign.

New Bristol Fighter aircraft arrived in ones and twos to establish No. 111 Squadron RFC which was shortly followed by No. 113 Squadron RFC, which took over corps operations, and to relieve No. 1 Squadron of some trench reconnaissances, as it in turn became a specialist bombing squadron. New pilots and observers from the training school, reported to the squadrons and in August, No. 1 Squadron was authorised by A.I.F. Headquarters, to hold a reserve of fifty per cent of flying officers above establishment. The full value of this provision not become fully utilised until the air war of 1918.

==== Sherifial Forces ====
Allenby was hopeful that Lawrence and the Sherifial Arab force could support a September attack, recognising that they were involved with harvests before September, but "must get going before the end of September" prior to their normal move to camel grazing lands in the Syrian desert. "They, naturally, won't and can't do much unless I move; and it is not much use their destroying the Turks' communications unless I take immediate advantage of such destruction ... If I bring them into the fight and do not make progress myself, this will also expose them to retaliation – which to some tribes, such as the Druzes, S. of Damascus, may mean annihilation."

The Arab rebellion is spreading well, and the Turkish communications will be difficult to guard against their raids. The enclosed photograph of the Shereef of Mecca, and the proclamation by him, is one of the means we have of inducing the Arabs to desert the Turks. We drop these papers and packets of cigarettes over the Turkish lines from aeroplanes. The proclamation is an appeal from the Shereef to the Arabs to leave the Turks and join in the war against them for the freedom and independence of Arabia. A good many come in, as a result of our propaganda.

— Allenby letter to his wife 3 October 1917

==== Supplies ====
Allenby's strategic plans for the capture of the Beersheba line and the eventual capture of Jerusalem, required the complete determination of the commander, and efficient supply lines to support the mobility of his force. The offensive relied completely on efficient lines of communication. In order for two divisions to cross the arid country to attack Beersheba, elaborate arrangement for the supply of water, food and ammunition were necessary. Indeed the absence of water dictated that the attack had to be decisive, otherwise the mounted divisions would be forced to withdraw to water.

However, a series reconnaissances and work by field engineers in the apparently waterless desert, based on intelligence produced sufficient water, to the west of Beersheba for the horses, and the horses circling to the south in a wide arch. (Note: The infantry attacked from the west. [Falls 1930 Vol. 2 sketch map 1 Situation at 18:00 28 October 1917]) Records of the Palestine Exploration Society revealed that Khalasa had been the site of the Greek city of Eleusa, 13 miles (21 km) south west of Beersheba and that Asluj had been a large town, 16 miles (26 km) south of Beersheba. The likelihood of finding water at these two places was investigated by the Commander of the Royal Engineers, Desert Mounted Corps and confirmed during discussions with the inhabitants of the area. Plans were made to develop these water sources. A 48-hour reconnaissance from Tel el Fara was carried out from 23 to 25 September to survey the roads and water in the Esani and Khalasa areas.

During the night of 20/21 October units of the XX Corps were sent forward to form supply dumps and to store water at Esani while Desert Mounted Corps engineers developed water at Khalasa and Asluj which had previously been reconnoitred by them. The standard gauge line to Imara was completed and the station opened on 28 October. The railway line was extended to a point .75 miles (1.21 km) north-north-east of Karm and a station opened there on 3 November. The light railway from the east bank of the wadi Ghazzeh at Gamli via Karm to Khasif was completed on 30 October. Between 22 October and 1 November water at Mendur to Sheik Ajilin was developed by the XXI Corps, at Esani, Imara, Karm and Khasif by the XX Corps and at Abu Ghalyun, Malaga, Khalassa and Asluj by Desert Mounted Corps. Cisterns in the Khasif and Imsiri area were filled with 60,000 gallons of water for the 53rd and 74th Divisions, to be supplemented by camel convoys.

After the 2nd Light Horse Brigade moved to Bir el Esani and the ICCB to Abu Ghalyun, the work continued night and day on the development of water. These two brigades were supported by the field squadrons of the Anzac and Australian Mounted Divisions. Allenby personally inspected the watering points at Shellal works and watched the engineers cleaning out the wells at Khalassa and Asluj. His surprise arrival and keen interest gave those carrying out the difficult, dirty work a sense of the importance Allenby attached to their work.

Regarding the importance of water, historian Matthew Hughes wrote: "[w]ater was the determining factor in the success or otherwise of Allenby's plan at the third battle of Gaza." (Note: The return of the Australian Mounted Division to water at Karm has been describes as negating "the whole purpose of the flanking operation ... the attempt to cut off the enemy forces had failed" due to delays caused by water difficulties. [Hughes 1999, p. 57]) Allenby acknowledged the problem on 21 August, saying "[t]he wells will probably be blown". He believed that there would be "some water" in the Wadi es Saba and Wadi el Imaleh but he was uncertain of the amount, acknowledging that it was "...the driest time of the year." Fortunately for the British plan, though, thunderstorms on 25 October had left pools of water over a wide area. While all possible steps were taken to ensure full and regular supplies, Allenby's administrative instructions included the following caveat: "[t]hese calculations are based on the scale of full mobile rations. It may be necessary to double all distances and to place the force on half rations." Nevertheless, Hughes notes that "without the water at Beersheba the cavalry was reliant on the rail terminals at Karm or even Rafah."

===== XX and XXI Corps transport =====
There was not enough transport to keep both the XX and the XXI Corps in the field at the same time. As a result, most of the lorries, tractors (excepting ammunition tractors), and camels of the XXI Corps holding the Gaza sector, were withdrawn and transferred to strengthen XX Corps' supply in the Beersheba sector, "striking flank." The movement of the XXI Corps transport to Shellal and Karm, along with the extension of the railway to Karm, was delayed until the last moment, to avoid drawing attention to that section of the front line. Meanwhile, dumps of rations, ammunition and engineer stores were formed in the XXI Corps area in concealed positions.

== 31 October to 7 November ==
=== Capture of the Gaza-Beersheba line ===
Force Order No. 54 by Allenby states on 22 October that it was his intention to "take the offensive" at Beersheba and Gaza, then make an "enveloping attack" towards Hareira and Sheria. "Allenby turned the Turks out of their defensive positions," the Gaza-Beersheba line was completely overrun, and 12,000 Ottoman soldiers were captured or surrendered. The subsequent advance would take the EEF to Jerusalem on 9 December.

Allenby describes the capture of Beersheba in his report written on in the evening after the battle:

We completed our movements for attack on Beersheba in accordance with plan by dawn today. Advanced works southwest of Beersheba were captured by XXth Corps by 0840. This Corps reached all its objectives by 1305 and held whole of central sector of defences between south and west of Beersheba. Meanwhile, Desert Mounted which moved round to east and north of town, captured Tel el Saba by 1600 and cleared Hebron road as far as Bir es Sakaty. Desert Mounted Corps, meeting considerable oppoisition [sic], was within three–quarters of a mile of town on north–east at 1630. XXth Corps was attacking works on left of its original objectives still held by Turks. We had now isolated enemy in works between XXth Corps objectives and Desert Mounted Corps. Neither prisoners nor booty yet collected but up to 1600 some 250 prisoners had been counted and some machine guns taken. Bombardment of Gaza defences has been continued by XXIst Corps. Large explosions were caused at Deir Sineid and also at Sheikh Hasan by naval gun fire. [Later] Beersheba occupied. Some field guns besides further prisoners included in captures.

— Allenby telegram to Robertson dispatched 22:30 on 31 October 1917.

Although the Ottoman defenders suffered many casualties at Beersheba, "stubborn fighting continued" against strong Ottoman rearguards, which delayed an EEF breakthrough for seven days. The continuation of the offensive so far from base depended on efficiently supplying the attacking force. The Australian Mounted Division was supplied by their divisional train which brought supplies to them at Beersheba on 2 November. (Note: Also on 2 November the British Foreign Secretary Arthur Balfour sent a letter to the most prominent Jew in Britain, Baron Rothschild a wealthy banker and head of the British branch of European Jewish causes. The letter known as the Balfour Declaration, proposed a national home for the Jewish People in Palestine, was published in The Times on 9 November 1917. [Grainger, p. 178]) On 31 October the Australian Mounted Divisional Train moved back from Esani to Gamli, where they loaded supplies before heading out for Reshid Beck where they arrived at 17:00 on 1 November. Departing at 09:30 on 2 November, they moved along the long dusty wadi Salia towards Beersheba via Hill 1070. The divisional train halted for a meal and rest when the animals were fed, before continuing on to arrive at Beersheba and bivouac at 20:00. At 08:00 on 3 November, they began offloading the supplies.

=== Medical situation ===
The ambulance stretcher bearers following closely behind the regiments collected the wounded where they fell. The first divisional collecting station was formed by mobile sections at Khasm Zanna, some 3 miles (4.8 km) east of Beersheba at 12:30. When this was full, at 19:00 second was formed nearer Beersheba. The 165 wounded from the Anzac and Australian Mounted Divisions were retained overnight. These wounded were transferred to the Ottoman hospital in Beersheba which was taken over after the operating unit and the Australian Mounted Division receiving station arrived at 07:00 on 1 November. The Anzac Mounted Division receiving station and convoy cars in reserve, arrived at 11:00 when evacuation was to Imara by Motor Ambulance Convoy and light (Ford) motor ambulance wagons began. On 2 November the XX Corps took over the Ottoman hospital when the Australian Mounted Division receiving station, transferred to the town hall where wounded from the fighting in the hills north of the city started to arrive.

==== Southern Judean Hills towards Hebron ====
For a week, the Ottoman defenders continued to hold most of the old Gaza to Beersheba line after the capture of Beersheba, including Sheria, and Gaza along with Tank and Atawineh redoubts. "It was not water so much as strong defence and cool action under fire by the enemy which held its line for seven days after the fall of Beersheba which allowed its army to retire in an orderly fashion." However recent histories have remained focused on the issue of water. "Water was the determining factor in the success or otherwise of Allenby's plan at the third battle of Gaza." Indeed, the return of the Australian Mounted Division to water at Karm has been describes as negating "the whole purpose of the flanking operation ... the attempt to cut off the enemy forces had failed" due to delays caused by water difficulties.

After the loss of Beersheba, the Ottoman defenders withdrew north north west towards Tel esh Sheria and northwards towards Tel el Khuweilfe. Those who retired northward were to defend the Seventh Army headquarters at Hebron and the road north to Jerusalem less than 50 miles (80 km) away. Here a considerable Ottoman force, including all available reserve units, were deployed in the Tel el Kuweilfeh area to face strong attacks by the Anzac Mounted Division. These attacks which began the day after Beersheba was captured, were strongly resisted during the Battle of Tel el Khuweilfe by the Ottoman defenders who feared a major cavalry attack.

==== Mediterranean coast ====
During the Third Battle of Gaza, several attacks were made by the XXI Corps by the 52nd (Lowland), the 54th (East Anglian) and the 75th Divisions. The main purpose of these operations was to keep the Ottoman garrison of 8,000 riflemen supported by 116 guns in place. The XXI Corps launched an attack at 23:00 during the night of 1/2 November towards Umbrella Hill. The second attack a few hours later at 03:00 was launched towards the El Arish Redoubt. These attacks, which concentrated on a 2 miles (3.2 km) long section of the defences between Umbrella Hill and the coast, aimed to capture three groups of trench complexes or redoubts, called el Arish, Rafa, and Cricket by the EEF. These fortifications were strongly connected by a "series of trench lines several layers thick, and backed by other trenches and strongpoints." During these attacks, which were never intended to capture Gaza, just the first line of Ottoman trenches, the XXI Corps utilised new infantry tactics, and were supported by tanks and a large quantity of artillery, organised according to a western front-style of deployment.

==== In the centre ====
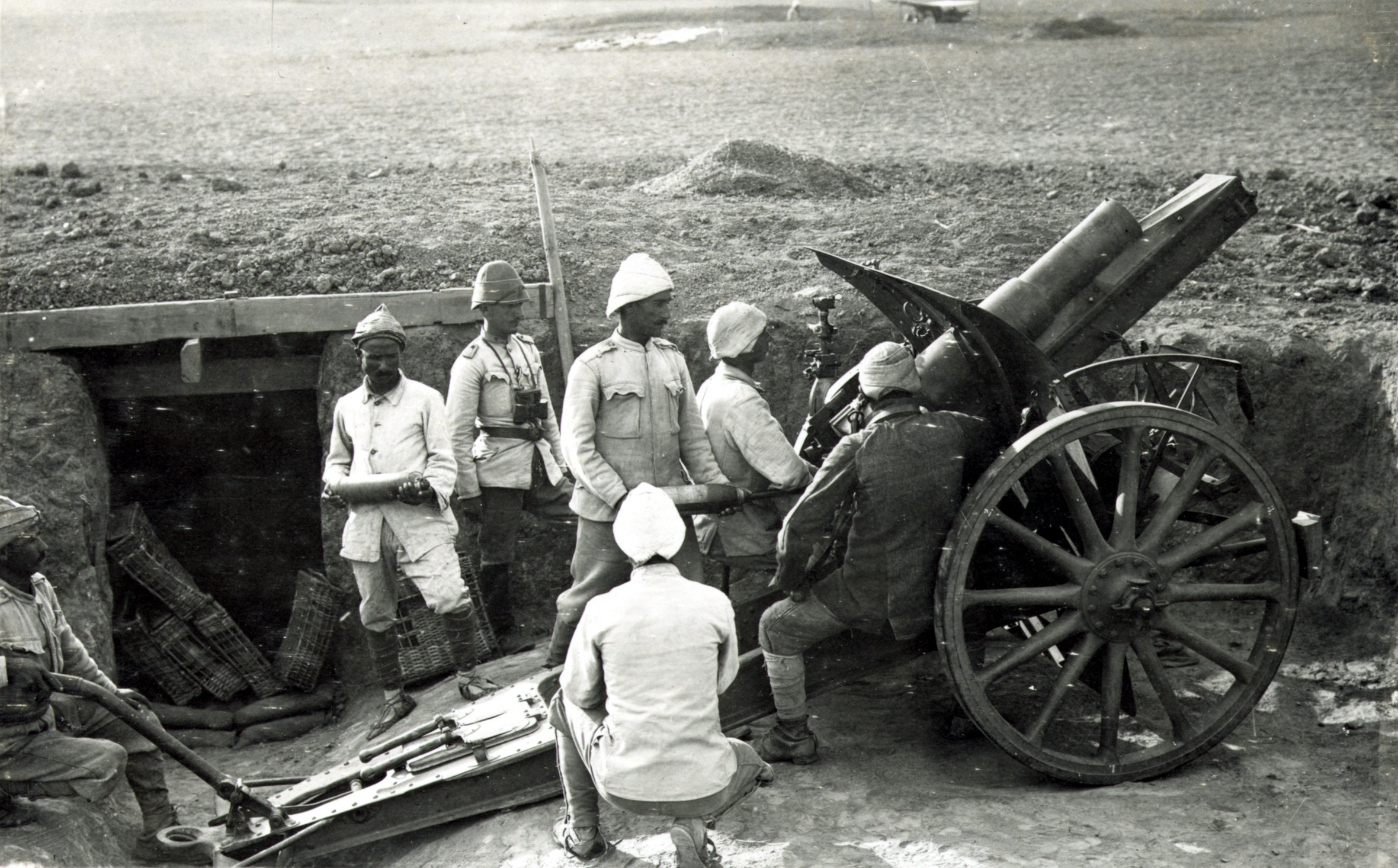
Ottoman Artillery at Hareira

The main flank attack on the Ottoman front line stretching from Gaza, was made on 6 November by the EEF in the centre at Hareira and Sheria, and a gap was created for the Desert Mounted Corps to advance to capture Huj on their way to the Mediterranean coast.

However, there were less than 8,000 horsemen available out of the 17,000 in Desert Mounted Corps. Only three light horse and one mounted brigades were immediately available on 7 November to participate in the breakthrough. They were the 1st and the 2nd Light Horse Brigades (Anzac Mounted Division), the 4th Light Horse and the 5th Mounted Brigades while the 3rd Light Horse Brigade (Australian Mounted Division), waited to be relieved from outpost work connecting the XX and the XXI Corps. Desert Mounted Corps’ strength had been cut by one third by the decision to leave the Yeomanry Mounted Division, the New Zealand Mounted Rifles Brigade, and the 11th and the 12th Light Armoured Car Batteries in the Judean Hills supporting the 53rd (Welsh) Division attacks at Tel el Khuweilfe. The Anzac Mounted Division was also less two squadrons and machine guns, and most of the Division's Field Squadron Australian Engineers which were still working to improve the amount of water flowing from the Beersheba wells.

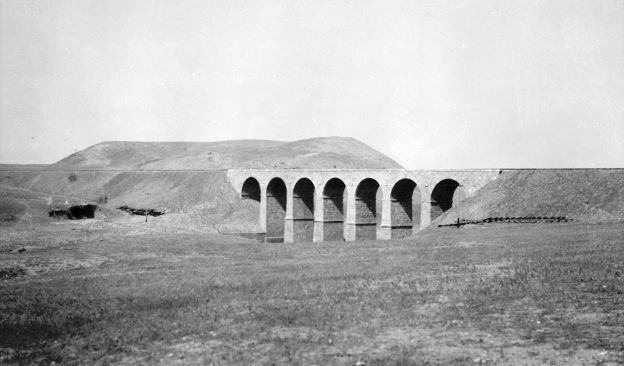
Tel es Sheria bridge

By 09:00 the Australian Mounted Division (less one brigade) was to connect at Kh. Buteihah with the Anzac Mounted Division which was steadily pushing back Ottoman posts to gain space for manoeuvre. However, the Australian Mounted Division was not in a position to advance until after dark, because of delays in the capture of Tel esh Sheria. After participating in the unsuccessful charge, the horses of the 11th Light Horse Regiment were watered at 06:00 at the Sheria Water Tower on 8 November, where the regiment was issued with rations and forage from their B1 echelon's special emergency rations. At 07:30 the 4th Light Horse Brigade informed the regiment that the brigade was moving at 09:00 in a northerly direction up the Wadi Sudeh. The 4th Light Horse Brigade concentrated .5 miles (0.80 km) south of Tel el Sheria and the 12th Light Horse Regiment moved off with the brigade northwards. Ottoman columns were reported retreating northwards from Atawineh towards Huj and Beit Hanun at midnight 7/8 November.

Meanwhile the opposing forces fighting for the Khuweilfeh Ridge, continued their long drawn-out struggle on 7 November without much change. Towards the evening the Ottoman forces began to withdraw, to conform with a general retirement along the length of the whole Ottoman defensive line, including Gaza and Sheria. At Gaza, a series of EEF infantry attacks during the night of 6 November were not strongly resisted and when a general advance occurred during the morning of 7 November the town was found to have been abandoned. The town which had a population of 40,000 people before the war, was completely deserted. By that evening, although not many prisoners had been captured "the enemy had been ejected from strong positions" which had been held successfully against the EEF for eight months.

== Ottoman withdrawal ==
The Ottoman XXII Corps was not defeated, but had skilfully conducted a tactical retreat from Gaza, demonstrating both operational and tactical mobility. Nor did the Yildirim Army Group attempt a strong counterattack. The Seventh Army commanded by Mustafa Kemal and the Eighth Army commanded by Kress von Kressenstein were instead ordered to "conduct a fighting withdrawal," with the Ottoman 3rd Cavalry Division screening the left flank of the Seventh Army. While the headquarters of Yildirim Army Group retired back to Jerusalem the headquarters of the Seventh Army retired back from Hebron to Bethlehem. A new defensive line 10 miles (16 km) north of Gaza had begun to be established, before disengaging their forces to withdraw during the night. Numerous rearguards covered the disengagement when many Ottoman troops died or were captured defending these rearguards. Under pressure from the main EEF advance in the centre and along the coast towards the Eighth Army, Kress von Kressenstein had great difficulty maintaining control and cohesion. By 9 November the Eighth Army had retreated 20 miles (32 km) while the Seventh Army had lost hardly any ground.

=== Rearguards ===
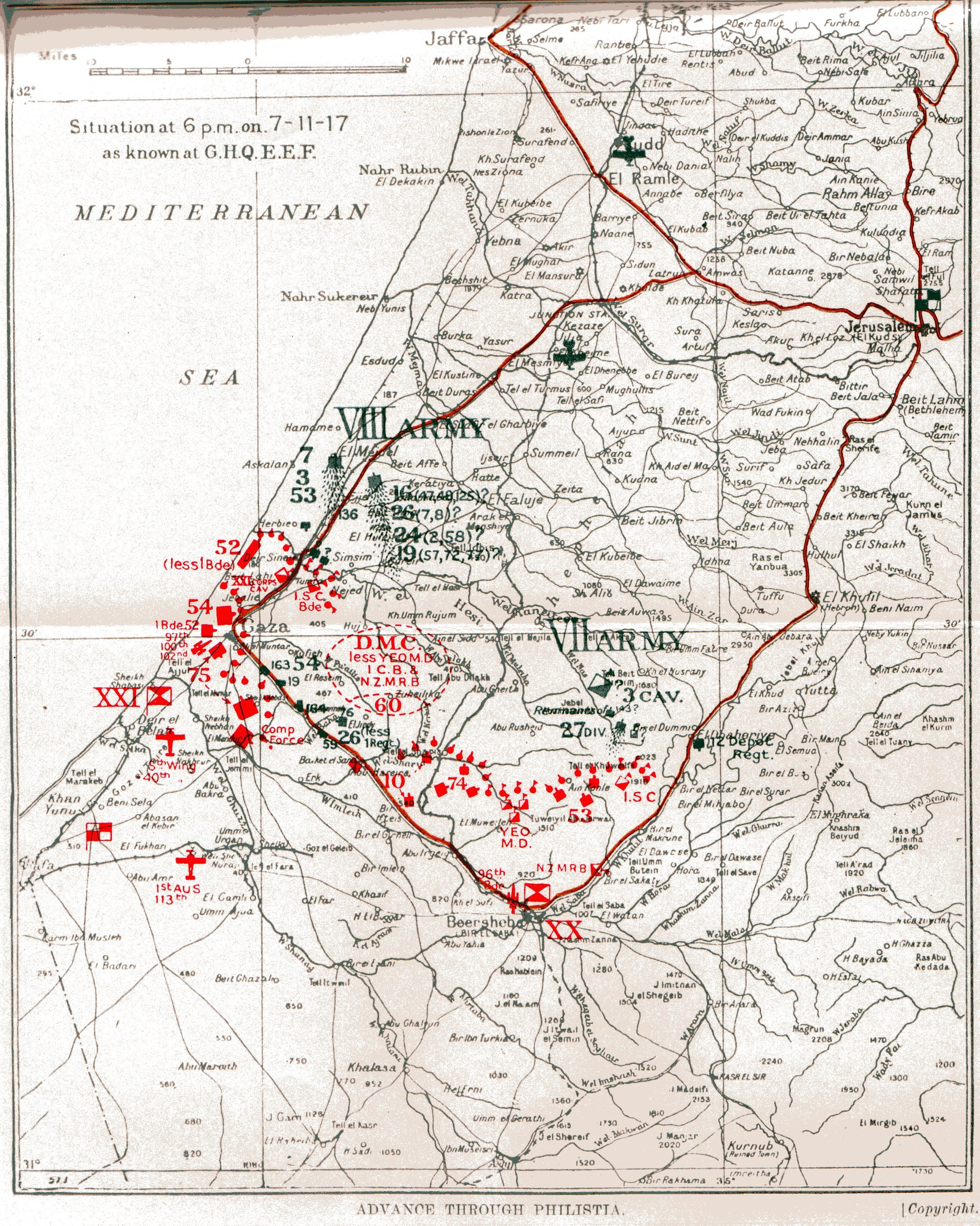
Situation as known to General Headquarters of the EEF at 18:00 7 November 1917

Although they had been retiring during the two previous nights, they strongly resisted, fighting the EEF mounted divisions on the intervening day. Rearguards formed by groups ranging in size from a company to several regiments, occupied every tell or other commanding ground to establish a strong rearguard position, from which they fought "tenaciously." Many Ottoman troops died or were captured defending their rearguards, but the sacrifice of the Ottoman rearguards delayed the EEF advance and saved the Eighth Army from encirclement and destruction.

After they evacuated Gaza, the Ottoman 53rd Division was ordered to advance across the front, passed Huj to stop Desert Mounted Corps' breakout. They attacked leading squadrons of the 2nd Light Horse Brigade which were driven in, before attacking the 7th Mounted Brigade on their left, which stopped the advance. However, when threatened by the 1st Light Horse Brigade on the right, the 53rd Division withdrew to the Wadi Hesi, but the delay to the mounted advance allowed the 16th and 26th Divisions to escape capture.

By the evening the Anzac Mounted Division reached Tel Abu Dilakh, the Australian Mounted Division on their left with the 60th (London) Division on their left. The breakthrough was only partial as strong well organised counterattacks blocked the mounted divisions at Tel Abu Dilakh, north of Tel esh Sheria and on the Wadi el Hesi line enabling the rearguards from the Atawineh, Tank and Beer defences to withdrawal. This disciplined withdrawal succeeded in preventing a rout, but the Ottoman defences were now only rudimentary and could not stop Desert Mounted Corps for long.

Two factors influenced the speed of the EEF advance, the frequent counterattacks and water. It was known that water was available at Bir Jamameh, at Tel el Jejile and Huj. However only part of the Desert Mounted Corps was armed for mounted attack. "But the fact that only two of the six brigades available were armed with the sword undoubtedly affected their tactics and pace in dealing with the opposition of the Turkish rearguards." (Note: Wavell is probably including both the 5th and 7th Mounted Brigades and the New Zealand Mounted Rifles Brigade which did not rejoin Desert Mounted Corps from Tel el Khuweilfe until 12 November, two days after the Yeomanry Mounted Division. [Falls 1930 Vol. 2, p. 124])

During 7 November, the Australian Mounted Division was delayed by strong Ottoman rearguards during the Battle of Hareira and Sheria near Sheria, while only two brigades of the Anzac Mounted Division were available to advance and threaten the Ottoman withdrawal, which continued unaffected. Chauvel requested the return of the Yeomanry Mounted Division to the Desert Mounted Corps.

== Pursuit 7 to 16 November ==
However, recent historians have overlooked the successful allied campaign of manoeuvre which resulted in the capture of Jerusalem, claiming the Battle of Megiddo in September 1918, was the "only successful allied campaign of manoeuvre in the entire Great War." The pursuit was hampered by problems with watering horses, lack of supplies, both of which were exacerbated by a khamsin, the hot southerly wind that stirred up clouds of dust and sand. One hundred motor lorries carrying full 1,800 litres (480 US gal) water tanks shuttled between Beersheba and Karm 26 kilometres (16 mi) away. Insufficient water and the frequent counter-attacks, which were most often directed against the right of the advancing mounted corps from the foothills of the Judean Hills, were the two major factors which slowed the pursuit.

All bustle and hustle with the Military. Natives rounded up with their donkeys and camels ... carrying stone jars of water in slings. Military Police on horseback at work on the populace. Red Cross cars parked after their activity ... Armoured cars cleaning their guns. Transport ... and mounds fodder ... aeroplanes flying low over the place. Wrecked pumping station ... Cavalry details passing ...

— Private Doug H. Calcutt, 2/16th London Regiment, 179th Brigade, 60th (London) Division Diary 3 November 1917

=== 7 November ===
The Anzac Mounted Division (less the New Zealand Mounted Rifles Brigade still attached to Barrow's detachment with the 53rd (Welsh) Division near Khuweilfe) received orders to advance to Ameidat on 7 November. They pushed through a gap in the Ottoman defensive line at Kh. Umm el Bakr. This gap had been created when the defenders closed up towards Tel esh Sheria and Tel el Khuweilfe. They rode to Umm el Ameidat, 5 miles (8.0 km) north west of Tel esh Sheria station on the Beersheba to Junction Station railway without being opposed for the first couple of miles. As the lead brigade, the 1st Light Horse Brigade moved in open formation over the plain they were shelled by Ottoman artillery from the west and north-west. As the 1st Light Horse Brigade approached the station at 11:00, the leading regiment were fired on. Instead of dismounting to the attack, they charged into the place which was captured after a "sharp fight," along with large supply and ammunition depots. At Ameidat they captured 396 prisoners and 27 trucks loaded with ammunition, ordnance stores including arms and saddlery. From their position 10 miles (16 km) behind the old Ottoman front line the Anzac Mounted Division was shelled from the Judean Hills on their right and the Ottoman heavy guns firing from Sheria and Atawineh redoubts on the left. These Ottoman guns also fired on the XX and XXI Corps covering the country in shrapnel, smoke and dust.

At noon patrols from the Anzac Mounted Division rode out from Ameidat north towards Tel en Nejil 4 miles (6.4 km) away on the railway, and north-west towards Kh. Jemmame on the Wadi Jammame also 4 miles (6.4 km) away. Half an hour later they were informed that Gaza had fallen and the division was urged to attempt to cut off the retreat of the Gaza garrison by advancing to Kh. Jemmame although the centre of the line around Hareira and Atawineh was still held by Ottoman rearguards. Both patrols were stopped by Ottoman rearguards, a very strong one was located on the Tel Abu Dilakh halfway to Kh. Jemmame. Although the 2nd Light Horse Brigade rode forward to support the 1st Light Horse Brigade's attack on the Tel at 15:00, and the combined force of the two brigades pushed the defenders back off the hill, the rearguard took up another strong position a short distance to the north. Although there was no water available, the Anzac Mounted Division bivouacked near Ameidat holding a battle outpost line stretching from Abu Dilakh to 2 miles (3.2 km) east of the railway. During the night scouts from the 3rd Light Horse Brigade (after being relieved from the outpost line connecting the XX with the XXI Corps) found touch with the Anzac Mounted Division near Abu Dilakh, and the 7th Mounted Brigade was sent to reinforce the Anzac Mounted Division, as the New Zealand Mounted Rifles Brigade was still in the Tel el Khuweilfe area with the 53rd (Welsh) Division. (Note: Chauvel has been criticised for not ordering the Australian Mounted Division to join the Anzac Mounted Division's advance which would have placed the 4th Light Horse Brigade in a position to make the Charge at Sheria from the flank. [Baly 2003, p. 125])

=== 7–8 November ===
==== Beit Hanun and Wadi el Hesi ====
It has been claimed the XXI Corps had no cavalry to "pursue" the retreating Ottoman army "up the coastal plain." However, the pursuit which eventually ended some 50 miles (80 km) north, began during the morning of 7 November when the Imperial Service Cavalry Brigade advanced out of Gaza to reach Beit Hanun where they encountered part of the Gaza garrison defending a strong rearguard position on a ridge 1.5 miles (2.4 km) south-east of Beit Hanun. While they succeeded in occupying a ridge west of Beit Hanun the village remained in Ottoman hands, until retiring behind the Wadi Hesi, 7 miles (11 km) north north east of Gaza in the sand dunes and in the cultivated area. Yildirim Army Group had marched through the night, to gain distance and time to establish a light entrench line defending water sources. Here, they were attacked by the 157th Brigade (52nd Division) which had marched north from Gaza. However, the Ottoman forces succeeded in holding the Wadi all day, resisting the EEF advance strongly, until late on 8 November.

The casualties suffered by the XX Corps between 31 October and 7 November were, 932 killed, 4,444 wounded and 108 missing. During this period they captured 2,177 prisoners, 45 guns, seven trench mortars and 50 machine guns.

=== 8 November ===
By the morning of 8 November, Ali Fuad's force was found north of Tel el Sheria, operating independently of the Seventh and Eighth Armies. Patrols by the Composite Regiment (Royal Glasgow Yeomanry, Duke of Lancaster Yeomanry 1/1st Hertfordshire Yeomanry squadrons) at Sheikh Abbas, found the redoubts along the Gaza to Beersheba road lightly held. Large sections of the Ottoman 26th and 54th Divisions had quietly retreated during the night of 7/8 November, while the EEF had been held up by the 53rd Division's machine gun screen. The Ottoman force withdrew through the narrowing gap between the EEF's mounted troops advancing on the coast and those inland. The rearguard trenches still held on the Gaza to Beersheba road, resulted in the XX Corps and XXI Corps transport making long detours, to avoid fire. The 232nd Brigade with the South African Brigade Field Artillery, 495th Field Company Royal Engineers and two sections of a field ambulance managed to advance to Deir Sneid during the day.

Hodgson ordered the 3rd Light Horse and the 5th Mounted Brigades of the Australian Mounted Division to advance, with the 3rd Light Horse Brigade's right on Kh. el Kofkha, and the 5th Mounted Brigade's left on Huj. Chauvel, aware of the advance by troops of the XXI Corps along the coast ordered Hodgson at 13:00 to send a regiment of the 4th Light Horse Brigade (which had returned to his command earlier in the day) to make touch them. The 12th Light Horse Regiment rode 12 miles (19 km) in one and a half hours, across country to join up with the Imperial Service Cavalry Brigade near Beit Hanun. And, late in the afternoon the Australian Mounted Division reached Huj, where the Yeomanry charge captured 30 prisoners, 11 field guns and four machine guns.

==== Huj ====
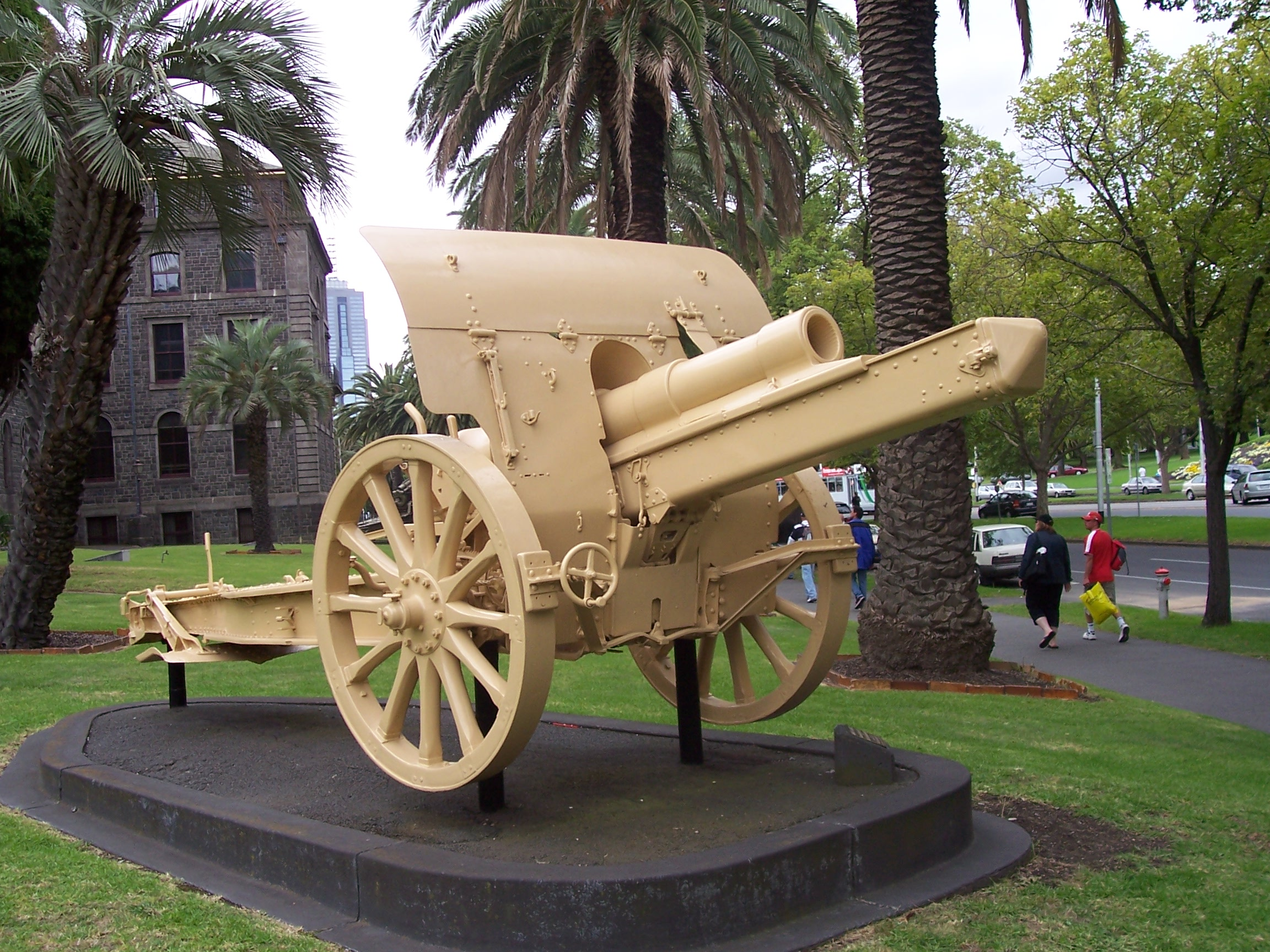
Ottoman Army howitzer captured near Huj now on display outside Victoria Barracks, Melbourne.

The advance towards Huj by the Australian Mounted Division, with the 60th (London) Division, resumed on 8 November, when another strong rearguard of artillery and machine-guns was encountered. While suffering "considerable shell fire," the 5th Mounted Brigade advanced on the left of the 60th (London) Division. During a personal reconnaissance by Major General Shea commanding the 60th (London) Division, he saw a "straggling column of enemy moving from west to east some three miles (4.8 km) ahead and a flank guard with artillery hastily taking up a position to the right front." He commanded the 5th Mounted Brigade to charge the Ottoman flank guard. A small contingent made a cavalry charge at Huj with sabres. These 200 men from the 1/1st Warwickshire Yeomanry and the 1/1st Worcestershire Yeomanry suffered heavy casualties but managed to reach the guns and cut down the gunners. In doing so they destroyed the last of the Ottoman strength south of Huj. However, no large groups of enemy soldiers were cut off. While the Australian Mounted Division captured Huj, which had been the site of the headquarters of Kress von Kressenstein's Eighth Army, the Anzac Mounted Division captured Wadi Jemmame and the water supply.

The 60th (London) Division reached the end of their lines of communication when they bivouacked about 1.5 miles (2.4 km) east of Huj. The division had marched 23.5 miles (37.8 km) between 05:30 on 6 November and 16:30 on 8 November, capturing the Kauwukah and Rushdi systems, and the bridgehead at Sheria; stopping a determined counterattack and pushing Ottoman rearguards from three defensive positions. They captured two 5.9 howitzers, 10 field guns, 21 machine guns, two Lewis guns and anti aircraft guns. The 179th Brigade suffered 28 killed, 274 wounded and two missing, the 180th Brigade suffered 50 killed, 249 wounded and six missing, and the 181st Brigade suffered 35 killed, 207 and 10 missing. The divisional artillery suffered 11 killed and 44 wounded.

==== XX and XXI Corps transport problems ====
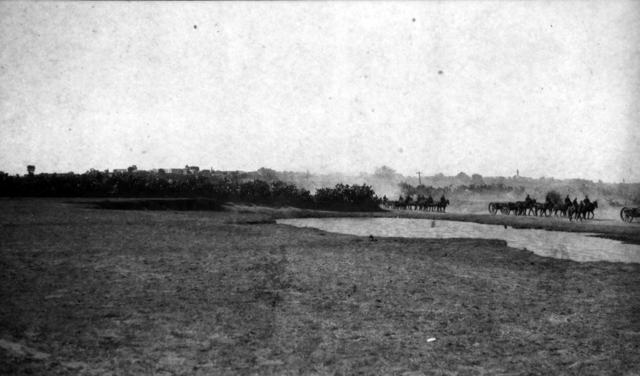
Transport wagons. Gaza in the background

Only one infantry division could be supplied and maintained at a distance of 20–25 miles (32–40 km) from railhead, with the camels and wheeled transport allotted to the EEF infantry corps. During the attack on Beersheba the transport of the XXI Corps had been assigned to supply the XX Corps, which marched back to near railhead at Karm after the victory. Here minimal transport was needed so the transport was sent back to the XXI Corps. Many thousands of camels in long lines slowly converged on their allotted areas, before being loaded up for the advance. Motor lorries caked with dust, also drove westwards across the sand and powdered earth. The sleepless drivers' vehicles were then load up before driving off to supply their infantry units.

The 60th (London) Division which could not be supplied north of Huj, remained in that area while the transport of the two infantry corps were being reorganised.

==== Desert Mounted Corps ====
So it was only units of the XXI Corps on the coast advancing to attack the Ottoman rearguard defending the Wadi Hesi line, and six mounted brigades of Desert Mounted Corps inland which were available to pursue the Ottoman army. Urgently needing reinforcements, Chauvel ordered the Yeomanry Mounted Division back to Desert Mounted Corps from Barrow's Detachment in the Tel el Khuweilfe area on 8 November. The Dorset Yeomanry (6th Mounted Brigade, Yeomanry Mounted Division) covered 60 miles (97 km) in 54 hours. Many of the frequent counterattacks directed towards Desert Mounted Corps, were against the right from the foothills of the Judean Hills held by the Seventh Ottoman Army.

A major Ottoman rearguard south-west of Nejile determined to keep the EEF pursuit away from the water for 24 hours. (Note: The average number of times Desert Mounted Corps horses were watered during the advance was once every 36 hours. [Preston, p. 316]) The pressure of the Anzac Mounted Division with the 7th Mounted Brigade attached, (while the New Zealand Mounted Rifle Brigade was detached from its division) eventually forced the rearguard to give way. However, the 1/1st Sherwood Rangers and the 1/1st South Notts Hussars (7th Mounted Brigade) were vigorously counterattacked at Mudweiweh on the Anzac Mounted Division's right which they "gallantly held off."

The Anzac Mounted Division (less the New Zealand Mounted Rifles Brigade) had ridden out at dawn towards Bureir, about 12 miles (19 km) north–east of Gaza, with the 1st and 2nd Light Horse Brigades in line covering a front of about 6 miles (9.7 km) centred about Abu Dilakh with the 7th Mounted Brigade in reserve on the right of the 2nd Light Horse Brigade. The 1st Light Horse Regiment (1st Light Horse Brigade) advanced at 05:45 towards Tell en Nejile, while the 3rd Light Horse Regiment (1st Light Horse Brigade) remained at Ameidat to guard the right flank. The 5th and 7th Light Horse Regiments (2nd Light Horse Brigade), on the left advanced towards Kh. Jemmame. The division rode across open, rolling, treeless, firm country dotted with prominent hills or 'tels' designed for cavalry with the Australian Mounted on their left. In the process, the 2nd Light Horse Brigade captured two guns, which had held them up the evening before.

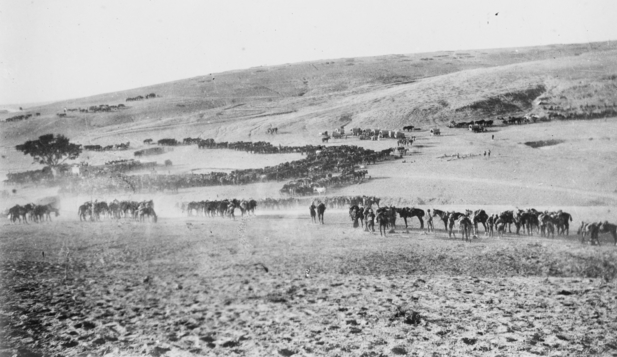
Horses queue for water at Jemmameh 8 November 1917. Ambulance horses and the end of the queue at 08:30 were watered at 17:30

From 09:00 long columns of retreating Yildirim Army Group units, with guns and transport, were seen moving northwards through Kh. el Kofkha towards Jemmame. After watering their horses at the Wadi Sheria, the 7th Mounted Brigade, arrived at divisional headquarters at 09:00 and was immediately ordered to reinforce the 1st and 2nd Light Horse Brigades in the centre. At 11:00 the 2nd Light Horse Brigade was counter–attacked strongly on the right of the mounted infantry line, near Tel el Nejile, and was held up while the 7th Mounted Brigade, in the centre, continued to advance towards Bir el Jemameh. By about 13:00 they had nearly reached their objective, when they were heavily attacked by the Ottoman defenders covering the water supply, forcing the brigade back, and endangering its left flank. The 1st Light Horse Brigade came up on the western side of the 7th Mounted Brigade, and drove the Ottoman attackers back, the leading troops of 1st Light Horse Brigade, the 3rd Light Horse Regiment fought their way into Bir el Jemameh/Kh Jemmame shortly after 15:00. Here they captured the wells, cisterns and steam pumping plant intact, including the engineer in charge. While a regiment of the 1st Light Horse Brigade secured the high ground to the north overlooking Bir el Jemameh protecting the area, the remainder of the brigade and the 7th Mounted Brigade, watered all their horses. Meanwhile, the 2nd Light Horse Brigade occupied Tel el Nejil station after dark, when the Ottoman 53rd Division's defenders had retired. Although some water was found here in the Wadi Hesi, it was not possible to water the horses of the outpost troops which established a night outpost line, protecting Nejil.

The Anzac Mounted Division had captured the country from Nejile to the north bank of the wadi Jemmameh, along with 300 prisoners and two guns. While the Australian Mounted Division advanced round the north side of Huj, their 4th Light Horse Brigade in touch with the Imperial Service Cavalry Brigade (XXI Corps) at Beit Hanun. During the day, their 3rd Light Horse Brigade captured prisoners and two Austrian 5.9 howitzers.

By the evening of 8 November, all the Ottoman positions which had made up the Gaza–Beersheba line had been captured and the enemy was in full retreat. During 8 November the EEF advanced 8 miles (13 km) to occupy a position due east of Huj, which had been the army headquarters and military railway terminus of the coast line. EEF artillery was then able to get into position just before dark, to fire during the night on the main road leading north from Huj. By the morning of 9 November, the road was littered with guns, limbers, ammunition wagons and transport of all descriptions, jumbled up into heaps with their teams shot.

The battle is in full swing ... My army is all over the place, now; on a front of 35 miles. I am at the centre of telegraph and telephone lines, in my old headquarters. I have no idea, yet what our captures are; but they will be something big, when all is collected. I hear that some parts of the battlefield are carpeted with dead Turks. My flying men are having the time of their lives; bombing and machine gunning the retreating columns. All my staff wear happy expressions of countenance. I fancy that Kress von Kressenstein is nearing the Jaffa–Jerusalem line, himself. I have many congratulatory telegrams – from the Sultan, the High Commissioner; etc, etc. and from General Maude – who has, himself, had another success; at Tekrit ... I hear of 43 guns captured, so far; but I don't know, for certain. We ought to get a lot eventually.

— Allenby letter to Lady Allenby 8 November 1917

Historians have characterised the pursuit as a failed attempt to capture the withdrawing Ottoman forces. That the XXI Corps advance from Gaza and the Desert Mounted Corps advance from Tel esh Sheria were to form "two jaws" to cut off and capture the retreating Ottoman armies. During this period, some horses only had one good drink in four days which had a serious effect on their condition. So only six of the 11 brigades of Desert Mounted Corps were available for the pursuit and having been short of water since leaving Khalasa/Asluj/Easni on 30/31 October their horses were far from fit. The unfit brigades were formed into a reserve corps and returned to areas where feed and water were available. When revived, they became available as reinforcements as the water situation north of Hareira and Sharia was sparsely populated with few very deep, low yielding water wells. Yildirim Army Group's tactics took the geographic conditions into account. They knew that if the EEF was delayed more than 48 hours without water it the pursuit would have to stop so strong rearguards were established to allow their infantry to withdraw well ahead of the slower British infantry. The EEF forces persevered in spite of the long marches on very limited forage and water, to attack the Ottoman forces relentlessly.

=== Manoeuvre warfare armaments ===
The vast transformation of warfare by the machine gun was demonstrated during 8 November, as it was not the Ottoman artillery which interfered with the Anzac Mounted Division's advance, but machine guns which prevented them from breaking through to attack and capture the columns. The 8 November also demonstrated the value of swords in mounted attack, directly during the attack at Huj and indirectly when the swordless Australian light horse were "compelled to make dismounted attacks" instead of attacking large retreating Ottoman columns. Before Allenby arrived, the British command had "contemplated withdrawing the swords from the Yeomanry regiments to lighten the burdens of their horses, on the ground that the arme blanche was little likely ever to be used."

=== Air attacks and support ===
==== No. 304 Bavarian Flying Squadron ====
Yildirim Army Group suffered a serious loss of aircraft, stores and aerodromes during the retreat. In order to protect their air force, it was decided on 4 November during a conference with Felmy commander of the German Air Force, that one of the new German squadrons based at Irak el Menshiye aerodrome, should move north to a new aerodrome near Junction Station. This move was delayed for three days "owing to urgent need of pilots" but by 7 November, when the move was finally ordered, transport was not available. A staff officer of the Ottoman Eighth Army arrived at 18:00 in a car to order an immediate retreat. No. 304 Squadron requested railway wagons to transport the flying material, but the only ones available were full of corn. The military commissioner argued that the Army Group had ordered provisions be sent back as a priority but the Flying Squadron officer threatened to machine gun the railway station if the wagons were not handed over. The corn was emptied, and the flying squadrons loaded holding up the departure of the train.

==== EEF aerial support ====
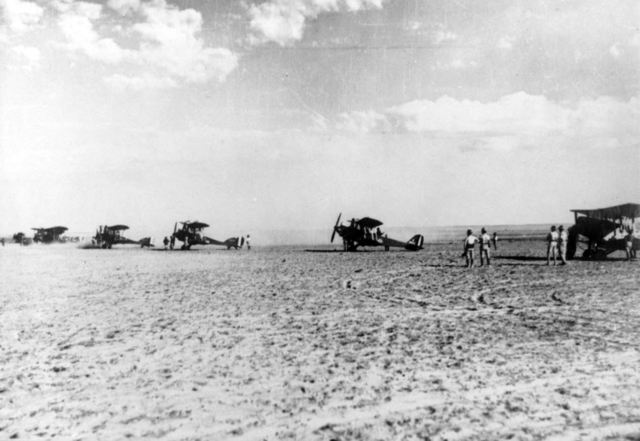
Three RE8 fighter aircraft of No 1 Squadron AFC prepare to take off on a bombing raid during the Southern Palestine offensive in November 1917

Air raids by the EEF were carried out during the night of 1/2 November when twelve bombs were dropped on Gaza. On 3 and 4 November air raids were made over the hills north of Beersheba. By 6 November it was reported that Ottoman hospitals were seen being moved back indicating the beginnings of a general retreat towards Mejdel which was also bombed by aircraft. Bombs were also dropped on the main positions behind the Kauwukah defences, near Um Ameidat, on Gaza and on shelters west of Sheria, and three aerial combats were fought against three hostile aircraft. During this time German aircraft had rarely been seen, but that afternoon two R.E.8s and two B.E.12.a aircraft from No. 1 Squadron on photography patrol were attacked by four Albatros aircraft and badly damaged. While a German aircraft was shot down in flames near the Wadi Hesi.

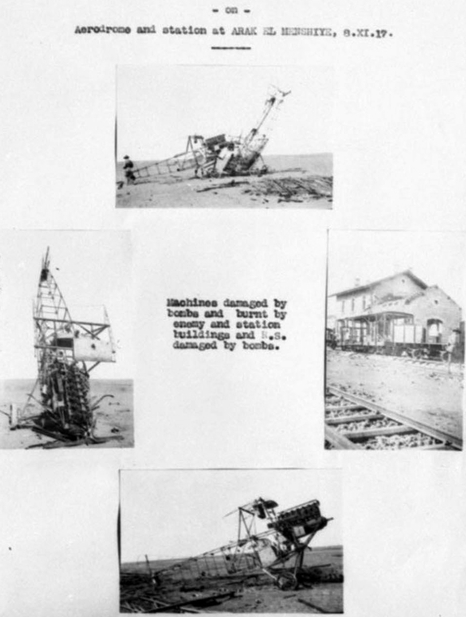
'Iraq el Menshiye aerodrome and railway station after EEF air raid on 8 November 1917

Up until the Ottoman withdrawal became apparent on 7 November, the Royal Flying Corps had mainly been involved in strategical reconnaissance by the 40th (Army) Wing, while the 5th (Corps) Wing had been undertaking artillery registration and tactical photography. Now most aircraft began bomb and machine gun attacks on the retiring columns. During the pursuit No. 1 Australian Flying Squadron, carried out the photographic work, taking detailed photos of the country and the position of the enemy immediately ahead, and took part in air raids. For a full week, they attacked the Ottoman columns with machine guns and bombs, as well as Ottoman infrastructure including aerodromes, transport and artillery, hitting many of their targets.

Concentrations of Ottoman forces were reported on 7 November at el Mejdel and Beit Duras, to the north of the Wadi Hesi. While the morning reconnaissance on 8 November reported the enemy retreating from everywhere, but the Ottoman aerial squadrons appeared to have been delayed. On the aerodromes at Julis (just beyond Mejdel), at Arak el Menshiye, and at Et Tine, aircraft were on the ground and many hangars had not yet been dismantled. A bombing raid by 30 aircraft, including nine Australian aircraft, attack the largest aerodromes at Arak el Menshiye in the morning. This raid, together with a repeat in the afternoon, caused considerable damage as 200 bombs were dropped including 48 hits, ten of which hit aircraft on the ground. Several hangars were set on fire or damaged, while aircraft on the ground were also damaged. Aircraft which escaped from Arak el Menshiye and Julis were bombed twice on 9 November. And at Et Tine on 9 November at least nine aircraft were destroyed. When Desert Mounted Corps reached Arak el Menshiye and Et Tine, on 10 and 11 November they found eight destroyed aircraft and the aerodromes along with the Arak el Menshiye railway station in ruins. Other targets included railway stations and junctions, troops on the march, supply dumps, transport were all continually bombed and machine gunned.

A further five hostile aircraft were destroyed at Ramleh aerodrome and another one at Ludd while the battlefield was covered with debris from aerial and ground bombardments. Hostile aircraft flew in formations of between two and four aircraft in an attempt to challenge the new superiority of the EEF aircraft but on almost every occasion were unsuccessful. EEF aircraft controlled the skies for a time, although a renewal of the air war occurred on about 24 November.

During the day RFC dropped nearly 300 bombs on various objectives. Troops and transport north of Julis and Falujeh were bombed with destructive effect and attacked with machine gun fire. In Julis station direct hits were obtained on rolling stock. 120 bombs were dropped later in day in and around El Tine. Several direct hits on hangars, two of which burst into flames. One direct hit on machine on the aerodrome. Stores near railway and station buildings attacked with effect; troops in neighbourhood scattered by a number of bombs dropped among them. Our pilots then descended and machine-gunned them.

— Allenby to Roberson Evening Report 8 November 1917

=== 9 November ===
The only infantry unit capable of advancing on 9 November was the 52nd (Lowland) Division's 156th (Scottish Rifles) Brigade, commanded by Brigadier General Archibald Herbert Leggett. The 155th and 157th Brigades of the 52nd (Lowland) Division were regrouping on 9 November, after fierce fighting for Sausage Ridge on 8 November.

Most of the Egyptian Expeditionary Force's infantry divisions were at the end of their lines of communication and were not able to follow up the Ottoman withdrawal. XXI Corps's 54th (East Anglian) Division was forced to rest at Gaza and the Imperial Service Cavalry Brigade at Beit Hanun. In the rear, Lieutenant General Philip Chetwode's XX Corps had transferred its transport to XXI Corps. XX Corps's 60th (2/2nd London) Division (Major General John Shea) was resting at Huj and its 10th (Irish) (Major General John Longley) and 74th (Yeomanry) (Major General Eric Girdwood) Divisions were at Karm. In the field were the 53rd (Welsh) Division (Major General S. F. Mott), corps cavalry, the Imperial Camel Corps Brigade and the New Zealand Mounted Rifles Brigade, deployed in the front line near Tel el Khuweilfe in the foothills of the Judean Hills north of Beersheba. Allenby ordered the Yeomanry Mounted Division back from Khuweilfe to Chauvel immediately, in the afternoon of 8 November but they did not arrive on the right flank of Desert Mounted Corps until two days later, on 10 November. The Imperial Camel Corps Brigade was also returned to Chauvel's command on 11 November when the New Zealand Mounted Rifle Brigade was ordered forward 52 miles (84 km) from Beersheba. They arrived 18 1/2 hours later. Meanwhile, Chauvel was forced to send the Australian Mounted Division back to water on 9 November, so only the Anzac Mounted Division (less the New Zealanders) which had watered at Jemmameh was available to continue the pursuit. Had the Australian and New Zealand regiments been armed with the sword they may have had opportunities for decisive shock actions in addition to the yeomanry cavalry charges at Huj, El Mughar and Abu Shushe.

The Ottoman Eighth Army troops were retiring in some order as quickly as possible, protected against serious attack, and fairly well ahead of their pursuers, while the Seventh Army in good condition, had retired about 10 miles (16 km) without interference, and was preparing to launch a counter–attack. While the EEF issued orders for the pursuit to advance on 9 November towards the Nahr Suqreir, more than 25 miles (40 km) north of Gaza, the next possible line of defence.

==== Isdud ====
By 9 November the Eighth Army had retreated 20 miles (32 km) while the Seventh Army "had lost hardly any ground." Soon after daylight, Chaytor's Anzac Mounted Division set out to ride across the maritime plain towards the coast, having watered their horses the previous evening. By about 08:30 the 1st Light Horse Brigade entered Bureir and around an hour later the 2nd Light Horse Brigade was approaching Friedrich Freiherr Kress von Kressenstein's Eighth Army headquarters at Hulayqat, where an Ottoman rearguard occupied a strong position. The brigade made a dismounted attack capturing 600 prisoners, large amounts of supplies, materiel and an abandoned German field hospital. At midday El Mejdel, 13 miles (21 km) north-east of Gaza, was occupied by the 1st Light Horse Brigade, when they captured 170 prisoners and found a good well with a steam pump, enabling the brigade to quickly water all horses. After passing the ancient town of Ashkelon the Anzac Mounted Division was notified by the Desert Mounted Corps that the XXI Corps was marching up the coast towards El Mejdel and Julis. As the main Ottoman road and railway leading north from Gaza were both cut Chauvel ordered the division to advance towards Bayt Daras, requiring the division to turn north-east. Subsequently the 1st Light Horse Brigade entered Isdud close to the Mediterranean Sea while, on their right, the 2nd Light Horse Brigade captured the villages of Suafir el Sharkiye and Arak Suweidan, a convoy and its escort (some 350 prisoners). As the brigade was reorganising to secure the prisoners, Ottoman guns further north opened fire, shelling both captors and captives alike. Just before dark the 2nd Light Horse Brigade captured a further 200 prisoners, before the Anzac Mounted Division took up a night battle outpost line, along high ground south of the Wadi Mejma, from near Isdud to Arak Suweidan.

Meanwhile Hodgson's Australian Mounted Division, spent most of 9 November searching for water, which was eventually found at Huj. By the evening of 8 November, the 3rd Light Horse Brigade had not watered since 7 November and the 5th Mounted Brigade since the evening of 6 November, and that if these two brigades were not watered the following day, the divisional war diary reported, "results will be most serious." After relieving these two brigades at 07:30 on 9 November, the 4th Light Horse brigade sent out patrols searching for water. The 12th Light Horse Regiment found one small well at Nejed, while another patrol found two wells at Simsim with basic lifting appliances which made watering very slow. They also found touch with the Anzac Mounted Division. By noon on 9 November the division was watering at Jemmameh, which was not expected to be completed until 18:00. After most of the horses had been watered, they advanced 16 miles (26 km) to the Kastina–Isdud line capturing prisoners, guns, and transports on the way. This march made during the night of 9/10 November was the only night march made during the Sinai and Palestine campaign, through Ottoman territory.

The Australian Mounted Division's 12th Light Horse Regiment (4th Light Horse Brigade) advanced north from Burieh to Al-Faluja arriving at 24:00 on 9/10 November when engineering stores and five burnt out aircraft were captured. The division was followed by the 4th Light Horse Brigade Field Ambulance and the divisional train made up of brigade transport and supply sections carrying rations. The field ambulance set up a dressing station and treated about 40 wounded men before moving through Huj at 16:00. After encountering rugged mountainous ravines and 6 miles (9.7 km) of very rough terrain, at around midnight they set up camp in a wadi bed.

Barrow's Yeomanry Mounted Division, had been fighting in the Tel el Khuweilfe region until Allenby ordered it to rejoin the Desert Mounted Corps, 20 miles (32 km) away on the coast. Meanwhile, infantry in the 10th (Irish) and 74th (Yeomanry) Divisions remained at Karm, while the 60th (London) Division remained at Huj.

=== 10 November ===
==== Wadi Sukereir ====
Falls' Sketch Map 9 shows position of the advance at 1800 on 10 November 1917

Ottoman forces were encountered on 10 November near Isdud on the Mediterranean Sea. The leading brigade of the 52nd (Lowland) Division, the 156th (Scottish Rifles) Brigade, advanced 15 miles (24 km) despite encountering stiff Ottoman resistance and was subjected to artillery bombardment from across the Nahr Sukereir. The 156th (Scottish Rifles) Brigade pushing across the Nahr Sukereir at Jisr Isdud, to Hamama. Here they successfully established a bridgehead on the Ottoman right flank. Ample water was found and the bridgehead was enlarged the following day. They followed the 1st Light Horse Brigade which had reported "All Clear" at Isdud at 08:30.

Although the Anzac Mounted Division reported on the morning of 10 November that the division was "ridden out" and had to halt for water, the 1st Light Horse Brigade had found water the previous afternoon at el Medjel and so was able to advance to occupy Isdud. However, the 2nd Light Horse Brigade was unable to advance on 10 November because of strong Ottoman rearguards near "New Beit Duras" and Kustine. They spent the day searching for water and watering the brigade, before moving to Hamama at night, to complete watering of the horses.

==== Summeil ====
The 4th Light Horse Brigade was ordered at 10:40 on 10 November to threaten the Ottoman force opposing 3rd Light Horse Brigade on the Menshiye–Al Faluja line. Between 08:00 and 10:30, the 3rd Light Horse Brigade had occupied the Arak el Menshiye Station while the 4th Light Horse Brigade entered Al-Faluja 2 miles (3.2 km) to the north-west.

The Australian Mounted Division was joined a few hours later by the Yeomanry Mounted Division which had left Huj early in the morning. They came up on the right of the Australian Mounted Division and took over Arak el Menshiye extending the line a little further east. By the afternoon of 10 November the whole of the Desert Mounted Corps with the exception of the New Zealand Mounted Rifles Brigade, (still at Tel el Khuweilfe) were in line from a point a little east of Arak el Menshiye to the sea. (Note: Desert Mounted Corps was less the Anzac Mounted Division. [Falls 1930 Vol. 2, p. 143]) Both the Australian and Yeomanry Mounted Divisions reconnoitred the eastern half of the Ottoman line running from Qastina, roughly through Balin and Barqusya, to the neighbourhood of Bayt Jibrin in the Judean Hills.

Chauvel ordered the Yeomanry Mounted Division to move westward to the coast to support the Anzac Mounted Division, leaving the Australian Mounted Division on the right flank. Neither he nor Hodgson commanding the Australian Mounted Division were aware at that time, that the division was threatened by three or four Ottoman Eighth Army infantry divisions. The 16th and 26th Divisions (XX Corps) and the 53rd Division (XXII Corps) were holding a 6 miles (9.7 km) line between the railway line and Bayt Jibrin, all more or less reorganised and all within striking distance. Ottoman trenches had been dug from Summil 4 miles (6.4 km) north of Arak el Menshiye to Zeita, 3 miles (4.8 km) to the north-east, and to the east of the railway line.

With its headquarters at Al-Faluja on 10 and 11 November, the Australian Mounted Division became engaged (during 10 November) in stubborn fighting, when the three brigades of the Australian Mounted Division ran into this Ottoman rearguard's left flank near the village of Summil. At 12:55, Ottoman forces were seen advancing from Summil, and the 4th Light Horse Brigade deployed to attack them, with the 3rd Light Horse and the 5th Mounted Brigade in support. By 16:30 3rd Light Horse Brigade headquarters were established 870 yards (800 m) south-east of Al-Faluja on the railway line, but owing to darkness at 17:15 the attack was not developed and night battle outpost lines were established at 20:00. The 4th Light Horse Brigade held a line linking to the Anzac Mounted Division at Beit Affen, while the Ottomans rearguard were holding a ridge near Barqusya with three cavalry troops, three guns and about 1,500 infantry.

=== 11 November ===
The mounted infantry and cavalry brigades of the Australian Mounted Division were unable to advance further on 10 November, due to intense Ottoman artillery fire which continued throughout the day. However, Summil was occupied unopposed, at 06:00 by patrols of the 3rd Light Horse Brigade on 11 November when the place was found to be deserted. However by 09:30 Ottoman units were holding a high ridge 1.5 miles (2.4 km) north east of the town and Ottoman field guns began shelling Summeil from about 3 miles (4.8 km) away. In the afternoon the brigade carried out active patrolling making themselves as conspicuous as possible without becoming engaged, while the division advanced north.

Allenby's force was deployed with infantry from the 52nd (Lowland) Division and the 75th Division in the centre, the Australian Mounted Division on their right flank with the Anzac and Yeomanry Mounted Divisions on the infantry's left flank. He ordered the 52nd (Lowland) Division to extend their position across the Nahr Sukereir on the Ottoman right flank. And, reinforced with two additional brigades, he ordered the Australian Mounted Division to advance towards Tel es Safi where they encountered a determined and substantial Ottoman counterattack. The New Zealand Mounted Rifles Brigade was ordered to rejoin the Anzac Mounted Division on 11 November. They left Beersheba at 16:30 and arrived at Hamama at 23:00 on 12 November.

==== Ottoman line ====
The 20 miles (32 km)-long defensive line, chosen by the Ottoman commanders to rally their 20,000-strong army and stop the invasion of Southern Palestine, was also designed to protect the Jaffa to Jerusalem railway and Junction Station. Prisoners had been captured from almost every unit of the Ottoman Army, indicating that rearguards had been driven back in on the main body of the Eighth Ottoman army. However, all along their line Ottoman resistance grew noticeably stronger. Erich von Falkenhayn, commander of the Yildirim Army Group, had decided to make a stand in front of Junction Station, deploying his forces by the evening of 11 November and he ordered a counterattack against the British right flank which was covered by the Australian Mounted Division. His plan was to overwhelm them, cut their supply lines, outflank and capture all the forward units. Originally ordered for 11 November it was postponed until the next day.

=== 12 November ===
==== Infantry attack ====
As part of the preparations for the attack on Junction Station, planned for the next day, the 52nd (Lowland) Division made a preparatory attack near the coast. They were to attack north of the Nahr Sukhereir between the villages of Burqa and Yazur with the Yeomanry Mounted Division acting as flank guard. Their objective was an important Ottoman rearguard position which ran from the village of Burqa to Brown Hill. While the village was easily taken the steep sided Brown Hill proved an extremely difficult attack. The hill was topped by a large cairn and commanded a long field of fire over the plain southwards across the Nahr Sukhereir. By the time a battalion of the 156th Brigade, covered by two batteries of the 264th Brigade Royal Field Artillery and the South African Field Artillery Brigade of 75th Division captured the crest, the battalion had been reduced to one officer and about 100 men. However, just 20 minutes after their victory, the remnants of the Scots battalion was unable to withstand an Ottoman counterattack and was driven off after a fierce struggle at close quarters.

The 2/3rd Gurkha Rifles were then ordered to renew the attack at dusk. Owing to poor light, the artillery was no longer able to give much assistance, but the Gurkhas quickly retook the hill with a bayonet charge, suffering 50 casualties, and in the process recovering two Lewis guns. The fighting here has been described as equal in intensity to the 157th (Highland Light Infantry) Brigade's assault at Sausage Ridge on 8 November. The success of these operations north of the Nahr Sukhereir opened the way on the Mediterranean coast for the main attacks the following day, on the Ottoman armies' front line positions.

==== Ottoman counterattack ====
Ottoman counterattack on 12 November 1917

While the infantry attack was in progress, the Australian Mounted Division advanced in the direction of Tel es Safi, to press the left flank of the Ottoman forces as strongly as possible. About 4,000 Australian and British mounted troops of 3rd and 4th Light Horse and 5th Mounted Brigades moved northwards in a conspicuous demonstration of aggression. The Ottoman force appeared at first, to have retired altogether, and the 9th Light Horse Regiment (3rd Light Horse Brigade) was able to ride through Barqusya, with one troop pressing on to occupy Tel es Safi. The 5th Mounted Brigade also found Balin unoccupied, and rapidly advanced northwards towards Tel es Safi and Kustineh. By 12:00 the Australian Mounted Division was spread over at least 6 miles (9.7 km) facing the north and east, when four divisions of the Ottoman Seventh Army (about 5,000 soldiers) began their counterattack. Ten minutes later the British Honourable Artillery Company horse artillery battery opened fire, but was hopelessly out shot, outnumbered, and out ranged by Ottoman guns of greater power and weight.

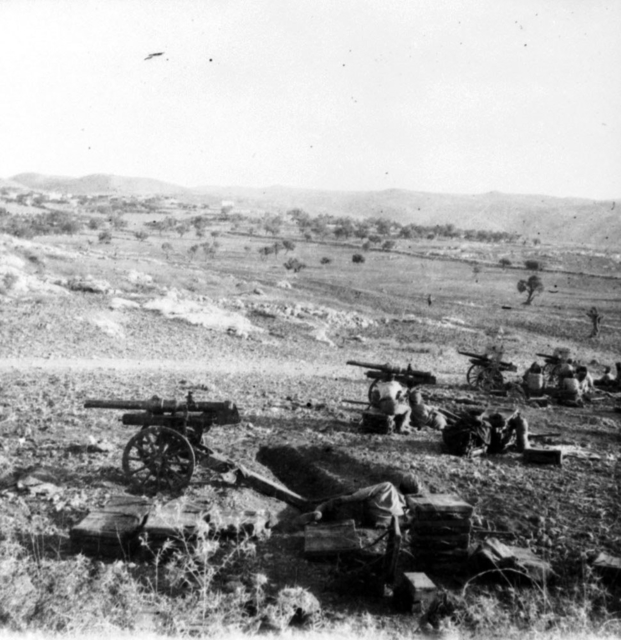
Hong Kong (Indian) mountain gun battery

The Ottoman infantry divisions were moving south from El Tineh 3 miles (4.8 km) east of Qastina from the Ottoman controlled branch line of the railway line. Here and further north along the railway, trains were arriving with huge numbers of Ottoman soldiers, deployed for the attack in three separate columns (of all arms). They were seen advancing towards Tel es Safi from the north and north-east. Not long afterwards, the 11th Light Horse Regiment (4th Light Horse Brigade) was forced to retire from Qastina, as Ottoman units occupied the place in strength.

The approach of the Eighth Ottoman Army's XX Corps (16th, 26th, 53rd, and 54th Divisions) was at first unknown to the 5th Mounted Brigade in Balin. But at about 13:00 they were attacked by about 5,000 Ottoman soldiers in two columns, one coming down the track from Junction Station to Tel el Safi, and the other arrived by train and marched south from El Tineh Station. The 5th Mounted Brigade, was pushed back out of Balin before they could be reinforced by the 3rd Light Horse Brigade which rode from Summil, followed by two batteries of the Australian Mounted Division. One light horse regiment which managed to occupy Berkusie, was forced to retire by a very strong Ottoman force supported by heavy artillery fire from several batteries. All available troops of the Australian Mounted Division were now engaged, but the Ottoman attack continued to be strongly pressed. The 4th Light Horse Brigade had been unable to support the 3rd Light Horse or the 5th Mounted Brigades, as they were being heavily attacked on the left of the 5th Mounted Brigade, while holding the line to the west towards Dayr Sunayd railway line. Ottoman units managed to advance to within 100 yards (91 m) of the 4th Light Horse Brigade's position, but were eventually stopped at the end of the day by machine-gun and rifle fire.

Hodgson (commander of the Australian Mounted Division) had ordered a slow withdrawal by 3rd Light Horse and 5th Mounted Brigades to high ground on the line Bir Summil – Khurbet Jeladiyeh. The order had only just been given when another Ottoman train was seen moving south. It stopped west of Balin and a fresh force of Ottoman soldiers rapidly deployed to attack the left flank of the 5th Mounted Brigade. Fighting steadily and withdrawing skilfully, the 3rd Light Horse and 5th Mounted Brigades reached the edge of Summil village, where the Ottoman attack was finally held. Two batteries of Australian Mounted Division had come into action on the high ground north-west of Summeil firing on the fresh Ottoman force moving over the open plain in full view of the gunners. Effective EEF artillery fire halted this attacking Ottoman advance, forcing them to fall back a little where they dug trenches. The attack ended at 18:00 in darkness. Chauvel's reliance on the steadiness of the Australian Mounted Division was "amply justified." The Yildirim Army Group commander had been forced to halt his Seventh Army's attack, and then to take away from it the 16th Division, plus one regiment. While in their eastern sector, the 3rd Cavalry Division (Seventh Army's III Corps) and 19th Division (Eighth Army) held a line in front of Bayt Jibrin. This force waited throughout the day, prepared to begin a flank attack, but the opportunity never eventuated.

=== 13 November ===
==== Mughar Ridge ====
Counter-attack and capture of Junction Station 12–14 November 1917

A 20,000-strong Ottoman force was deployed to defend the Jaffa to Jerusalem railway along the Wadi al-Sarar and Al-Nabi Rubin. They held the prominent 100-foot (30 m) high ridge, which stretched north towards Zernukah and El Kubeibeh dominated the battlefield, which consisted of mainly bare and open cultivated land. This naturally strong ridge formed the backbone of the Ottoman Army's 20-mile (32 km) long defensive position defended by the Eighth Army's 3rd Division (XXII Corps) to the north, the 7th Division (Eighth Army Reserve) to the east, the 54th Division (XX Corps) near el Mesmiye, with the 53rd Division linking to the 26th Division (XX Corps) holding Tel es Safi. On the ridge, the villages of Qatra and Al-Maghar had been fortified to become two strong defensive positions, each with commanding views of the countryside. These villages were separated by the Wadi Jamus, which links the Wadi al-Sarar with the Nahr Rubin.

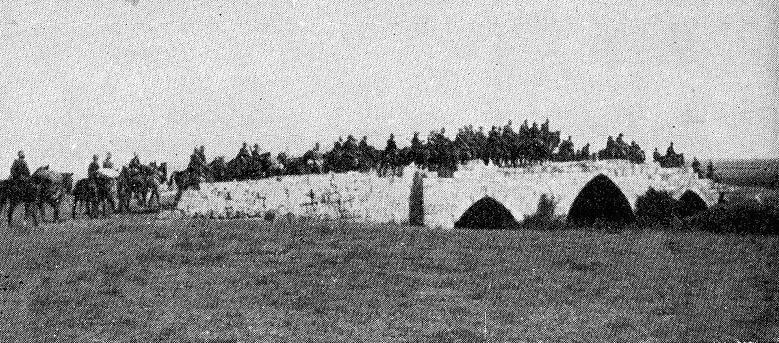
New Zealand Mounted Rifles Brigade crossing old crusader bridge at Yibna

Allenby's plan for 13 November was to turn the right flank of the Ottoman line on the coast, despite aircraft and cavalry reconnaissances revealing the large Ottoman force, inland on his right flank facing the Australian Mounted Division. Indeed the division was ordered to make as big a demonstration of their activities, as possible, to focus Ottoman attention away from the coastal sector. Here Allenby planned for the Anzac and Yeomanry Mounted Divisions to advance northwards to attempt to turn the Ottoman right flank, assisted by infantry attacks on the Ottoman right centre.

In the centre, the XXI Corps' 52nd (Lowland) and the 75th Divisions were to advance towards Junction Station between the Gaza road on the right, and the village of El Mughar on the left. These infantry attacks were held up by very strong Ottoman defences. At Mesmiye the Ottoman Army was strongly deployed on high ground in and near the village, and well-sited machine-guns swept all approaches. However, infantry in the 75th Division made steady slow progress, eventually forcing the main body of the Ottoman rear guard, to fall back to a slight ridge 1 mile (1.6 km) to the north-east. Towards dusk the final stage of the infantry assault was supported by two troops of 11th Light Horse Regiment (4th Light Horse Brigade), who galloped into action on the infantry's right flank and gave valuable fire support. An infantry frontal attack covered by machine-gun fire drove the Ottoman defenders off the ridge, enabling Mesmiye esh Sherqiye to be occupied soon after. Subsequently they halted in darkness not far from Junction Station.

Capture of Junction Station

On their right flank the Australian Mounted Division's 3rd and 4th Light Horse and 5th Mounted Brigades, reinforced by the 2nd Light Horse Brigade (Anzac Mounted Division), the 7th Mounted Brigade (Yeomanry Mounted Division) and two cars of the 12th Light Armoured Motor Battery, attacked in line advancing northwards towards Junction Station. (Note: Although Falls Map 9 shows the 3rd Light Horse Brigade on the left of the 155th Brigade near Yebna on 13 November and south of Summil on 12 November, this light horse brigade's War Diary confirms the brigade remained with its division, on the right of the main attack. [3rd Light Horse Brigade War Diary November 1917 AWM4-10-3-34]) The 4th Light Horse Brigade covering the right flank of the 75th Division, entered Qazaza at 12:00, when the 7th Mounted Brigade on their left, was only .5 miles (0.80 km) from Junction Station. By 16:00 the 4th Light Horse Brigade was ordered to push forward to El Tineh as the infantry advance on their left was progressing. It was occupied the following morning.

On the left flank of the XXI Corps, the remainder of the Desert Mounted Corps; the Anzac and the Yeomanry Mounted Divisions covered the infantry attack, with Yibna as their first objective and Aqir their second. As soon as Junction Station was captured they were to swing north to occupy Ramla and Lod and reconnoitre towards Jaffa. After capturing Yibna, the 8th Mounted Brigade (Yeomanry Mounted Division) continued their advance northwards, to El Kubeibeh and Zernukah. However, the 22nd Mounted Brigade was held up by Ottoman units defending Aqir, while the 6th Mounted Brigade (with the Imperial Camel Brigade covering their northern flank) was directed to attack el Mughar.

The 52nd (Lowland) Division had been halted at about 11:30 by heavy shrapnel and machine-gun fire forcing them to the shelter of the Wadi Jamus about 600 yards (550 m) from their objective. Every attempt to leave the wadi was stopped by very heavy fire from well placed Ottoman machine-guns. At about 14:30 it was agreed between the GOC 52nd (Lowland) Division and the GOC Yeomanry Mounted Division that the 6th Mounted Brigade should attack the El Mughar ridge in combination with a renewed infantry assault on Qatra and El Mughar. Half an hour later two mounted regiments, the Royal Buckinghamshire Yeomanry and the Queen's Own Dorset Yeomanry (6th Mounted Brigade), already deployed in the Wadi Jamus, advanced in column of squadrons extended to four paces across 3,000 yards (2.7 km), at first trotting then galloping up and onto the crest of the ridge. The horses were completely exhausted and could not continue the pursuit of the escaping Ottoman units down the far side. However, the Ottoman defenders continued to hold El Mughar village until two squadrons of the Berkshire Yeomanry regiment (6th Mounted Brigade) fighting dismounted, with two battalions of the 52nd (Lowland) Division, renewed the attack. Fighting in the village continued until 17:00 when both of the crucial fortified villages of Qatra and El Mughar were captured.

=== 14 November ===
Units of the 75th Division supported by several armoured cars occupied Junction Station during the morning of 14 November, cutting the Ottoman Jaffa to Jerusalem railway. While the 52nd (Lowland) and 75th Divisions concentrated and reorganised their ranks during the day, the 4th Light Horse Brigade entered El Tineh early in the morning, with the remainder of the Australian Mounted Division following a couple of hours later. Here good wells containing plenty of water were found but without steam pumps, watering was not complete until 16:00. Meanwhile, their divisional Supply Train followed, travelling from Beersheba via Hareira and Gaza on 11 November, to reach Isdud on 14 November, then on to Mesymie the next day and Junction Station on 16 November.

==== Ayun Kara ====
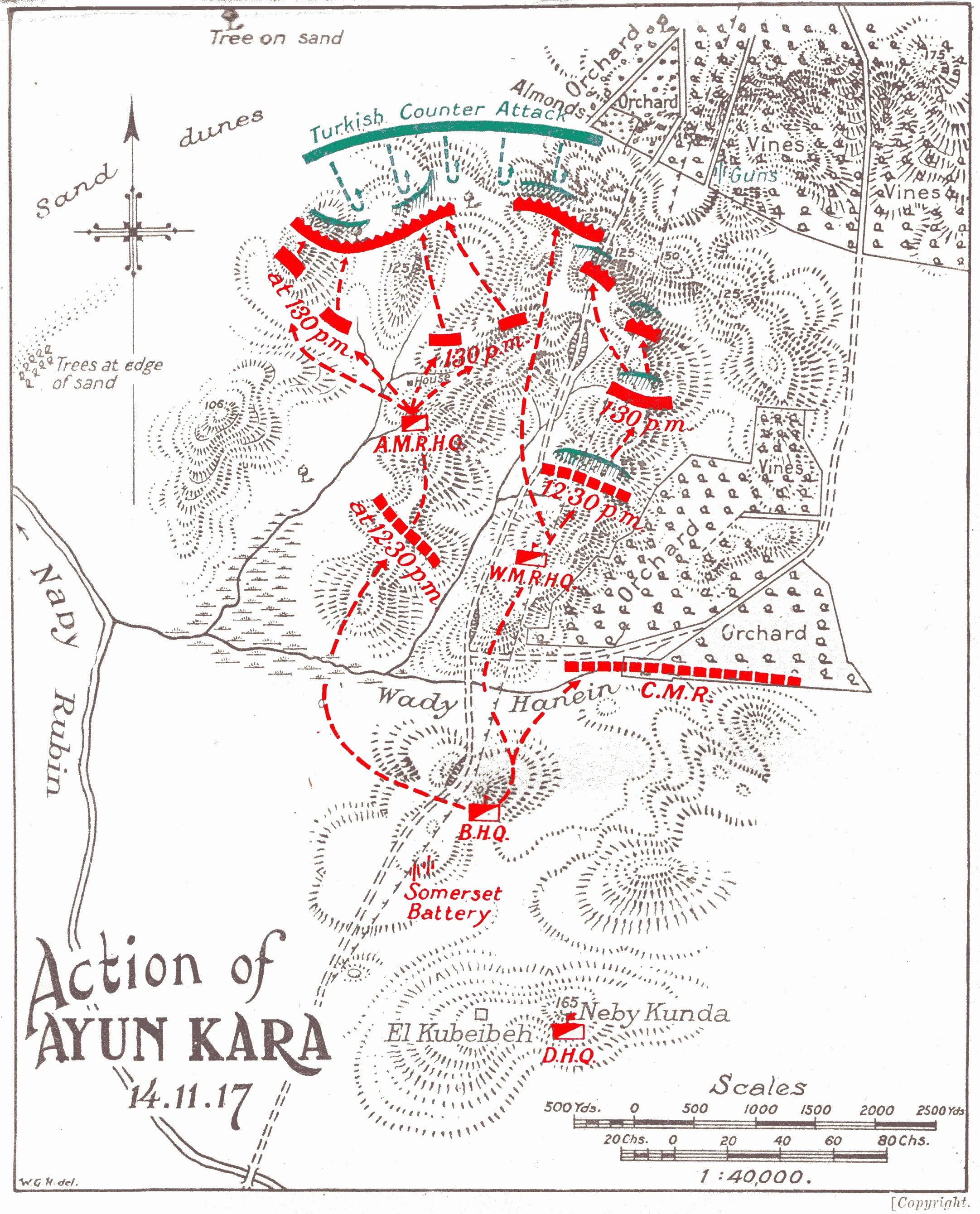
Ayun Kara attacks

The advance was taken over by the Yeomanry Mounted Division which crossed the railway north of Junction Station, and the Anzac Mounted Division which pressed the retreating Ottoman Army northwards near the coast. The Anzac Mounted Division had been ordered capture Ramleh and Ludd, and cut the only road linking Jaffa to Jerusalem. During the morning Meldrum's New Zealand Mounted Rifles Brigade crossed the Wadi es Surar/Nahr Rubin close to the sand dunes with 1st Light Horse Brigade on its right, and by 09:00 had occupied El Kubeibeh. They pushed on towards the Wadi Hunayn where Ottoman rearguards were encountered in the orange groves and on the hills between El Kubeibeh and the sand dunes. About noon the 1st Light Horse Brigade drove an Ottoman rearguard from a ridge facing Yibna and occupied the village of Rehovot also known as Deiran. At the same time the New Zealand Mounted Rifles Brigade (commanded by Brigadier General William Meldrum) ran into a determined and well entrenched Ottoman rearguard near Ayun Kara, which they attacked. Fierce close quarter fighting against the Ottoman 3rd Infantry Division continued during the afternoon. Although severely threatened, the New Zealand Mounted Rifle Brigade eventually prevailed and they occupied Jaffa two days later, unopposed. The official New Zealand historian concluded in 1922 that the engagement at Ayun Kara demonstrated the ability of the New Zealand mounted rifles regiments to rapidly attack and reinforce successive positions on horseback. During this intense engagement, the attacking power of the mounted rifle arm, against a strongly entrenched infantry position was comprehensively proven.

=== 15 November 1917 ===
==== Abu Shusheh, Ludd and Ramleh ====
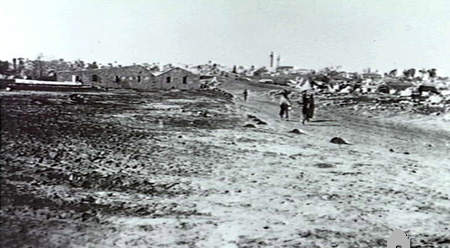
Ramleh after occupation by the EEF

At midnight on 14 November von Falkenhayn ordered a general withdrawal and the Ottoman Seventh Army, which retreated back into the Judean Hills towards Jerusalem, while the Eighth Army was ordered to retreat to the north of Jaffa across the Nahr el Auja about 3 miles (4.8 km) north of Jaffa. These Ottoman armies had suffered heavily, and lost between 40 and 60 miles (64 and 97 km) of Ottoman territory north of the old Gaza–Beersheba line. These two Ottoman armies left behind 10,000 prisoners of war and 100 guns.

The day after the action at Ayun Kara, the 75th Division and the Australian Mounted Division advanced towards Latron where the Jaffa to Jerusalem road enters the Judean Hills, while the Anzac Mounted Division occupied Ramleh and Ludd about 5 miles (8.0 km) north of Junction Station. An Ottoman rearguard above Abu Shusheh blocked the Vale of Ajalon on the right flank of the advance towards Ramleh. The Yeomanry Mounted Division reached the Jerusalem road, after the 6th Mounted Brigade made a cavalry charge, which overwhelmed an Ottoman rearguard position. This charge has been described as even more difficult than that at Mughar Ridge, owing to the rocky nature of the ground over which the horsemen rode.

=== 16 November ===
The pursuit continued as the EEF pushed north, Jaffa was captured by the Anzac Mounted Division in mid–November, and Jerusalem was captured by the XX Corps on 9 December. Desert Mounted Corps alone captured more than 9,000 prisoners and 80 guns before the new front stabilised in the Judean Hills. Seventeen days of operations virtually without rest, had resulted in an advance of between 50 and 60 miles (80 and 97 km) from Beersheba; major and minor engagements occurring on 13 of those days. Most of the mounted units had covered at least 170 miles (270 km) since 29 October 1917 capturing 5,270 prisoners and over 60 guns and about 50 machine-guns. Since the advance from Gaza and Beersheba began very heavy casualties and over 10,000 Ottoman prisoners of war and 100 guns had been captured by the Egyptian Expeditionary Force.

The EEF had evolved into a "genuinely imperial all–arms force" and the offensive was a "nearly ideal instance of the proper use of all arms in combination."

==== Jaffa and Latron ====
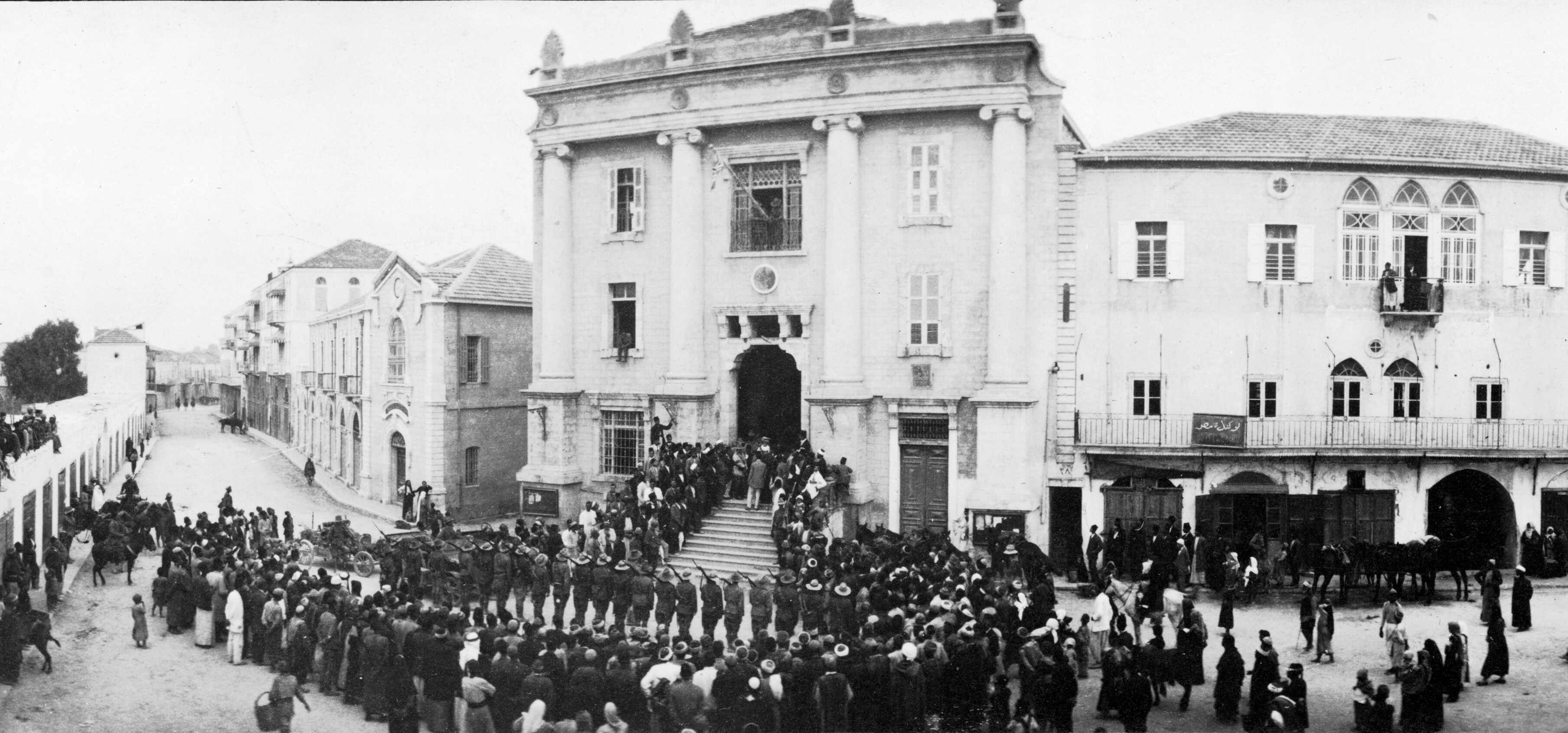
New Zealand Mounted Rifles Brigade accept surrender of Jaffa at town hall

On 16 November Latron was captured and the New Zealand Mounted Rifle Brigade (Anzac Mounted Division) occupied Jaffa, without opposition. They administered the city until representatives of the director of Occupied Enemy Territory arrived to take over the job.

== Judean Hills 19–24 November ==
Despite not having established a defensive line of entrenchments, Allenby reviewed the threat of counterattack and his supply situation. He decided that a force large enough to attack into the Judean Hills, and another separate force to operate on the maritime plain, could be maintained at an extended distance from base.

On 18 November, while Allenby was at the XXI Corps headquarters at El Kastine, the decision was made to closely follow the Ottoman Seventh Army into the Judean Hills. This decision, to quickly attack Fevzi Pasha's Seventh Army in the Judean Hills, was to keep the pressure on this Ottoman army with the hope of capturing Jerusalem, while denying them time to complete their reorganisation, dig deep trenches or worst of all, counterattack. Two infantry divisions; the 52nd (Lowland) (Major General J. Hill) and the 75th Division,(Major General P. C. Palin), and two mounted divisions; the Yeomanry and the Australian Mounted Divisions, were to begin the advance into the Judean Hills. The Ottoman forces they encountered on the road into the hills, were rearguards von Falkenhayn had ordered the XX Corps to establish, as it retired back to defend Jerusalem. Established on commanding ridges, these rearguards were made up of small groups dug in on the hills, each of which were attacked one after the other by Indian and Gurkha troops who outmanoeuvred the Ottoman defenders. "[A]ll the armies that have sought to take Jerusalem have passed this way, save only that of Joshua. Philistine and Hittite, Babylonian and Assyrian, Egyptian and Roman and Greek, Frankish Knights of the Cross, all have passed this way, and all have watered the hill of Amwas with their blood."

=== Nebi Samwil ===
After taking over the advance on 19 November, the 75th Division with the Yeomanry Mounted Division on their northern flank, advanced towards Nebi Samwil. This fortified and prominent hill 908 metres (2,979 ft) above sea level in the Judean Hills, was the traditional site of the tomb of the Prophet Samuel, was eventually captured late in the evening by the 234th Brigade, 75th Division, after particularly fierce fighting between 21 and 24 December. They had been supported during this battle by the 52nd (Lowland) Division which had taken the more difficult line, when the 75th Division had been directed to the south western approaches. These two divisions of the XXI Corps commanded by Bulfin had been involved in the extremely successful, but almost continuous fighting advance from 7 November. Their part in this first campaign of manoeuvre has them "advance[ing] in stages and then faltered in the hills around Jerusalem ... [where they were] [d]efeated by the Turkish forces defending Jerusalem" and withdrawn. Here Fevzi's Seventh Army fought them to a standstill.

== Mediterranean coast 24–25 November ==
=== Nahr el Auja ===
On 24 November, infantry from the 54th (East Anglian) Division and the Anzac Mounted Division began their attack on the Mediterranean coast, to the north of Jaffa across the Nahr el Auja. The northern bank was defended by the Ottoman 3rd and 7th Divisions (Eighth Army).

Two bridgeheads were established by the New Zealand Mounted Rifles Brigade. The first was across the bridge on the main road near Khurbet Hadrah, while the second was established on the coast Sheik Muanis, near the mouth of the river. Their aims were to discourage the Ottoman Eighth Army from transferring troops into the Judean Hills to reinforce the Seventh Army, and to gain territory. The New Zealand Mounted Brigade, and two infantry battalions of the 54th (East Anglian) Division, continued to hold these two bridgeheads on the northern bank, until they were attacked by overwhelming forces on 25 November. The 3rd and 7th Divisions of the Ottoman Eighth Army pushed back the bridgeheads and restored their hold on the Nahr el Auja, and the tactical situation.

== Relief of XXI Corps and Desert Mounted Corps 24 November to 2 December ==
On 24 November also, Allenby ordered the relief of the XXI Corps and Desert Mounted Corps by the XX Corps. This relief of the XXI Corps has been described as, "[t]his unnecessary shifting of troops [which] was a time–consuming procedure that delayed Jerusalem's fall ... [due] to the timid nature of the British advance."

Owing to supply problems during the advance from Beersheba, Allenby had left Philip W. Chetwode's XX Corps in the rear close to the lines of communication where they could be easily supplied and refitted. After 10 days rest, these fresh troops were ordered to the front in the Judean Hills to take over the offensive against the Ottoman Seventh Army. On 23 November, the 60th (London) Division, commanded by Major General John Shea, arrived at Latron from Huj and relieved the seriously depleted 52nd (Lowland) and the 75th Divisions, without much of a reduction in fighting ability on 28 November. On the same day, the 74th (Yeomanry) Division, commanded by Major General E. S. Girdwood, arrived at Latron from Karm, and two days later the 10th (Irish) Division, commanded by Major General J. R. Longley, also arrived at Latron from Karm. The movement of such large formations made a pause in the fighting unavoidable, and so the attack was discontinued, but von Falkenhayn and his Ottoman Army took notice of the temporary cessation of hostilities.

== Ottoman counterattacks 27 November to 1 December ==
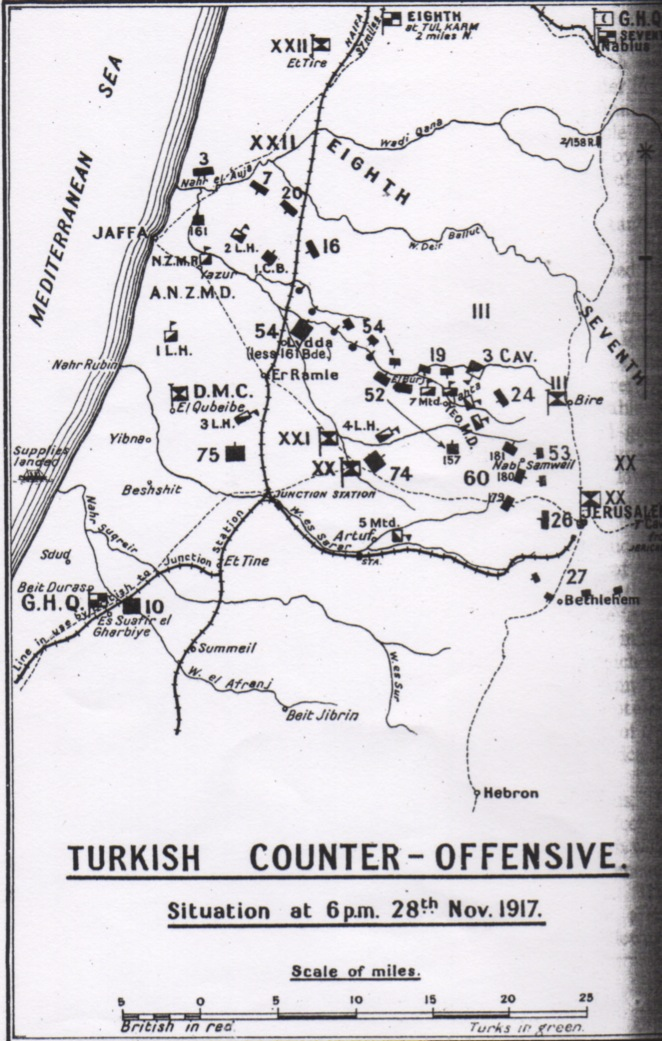
Ottoman counterattacks 18:00 hours 28 November 1917

Von Falkenhayn and the Ottoman Army sought to benefit from the weakened and depleted state of the worn out British Empire divisions which had been fighting and advancing since the beginning of the month. During the week beginning 27 November the Ottoman Army launched a series of infantry attacks employing shock tactics in the hope of breaking the British lines during the period of destabilisation created by EEF reinforcements and withdrawals. Counterattacks were launched by the Ottoman 16th and 19th Divisions in the Judean Hills on Nebi Samweil and on the Zeitun plateau. Attacks were also launched against British lines of communication via a gap between the British forces on the maritime plain and those in the Judean Hills and also against several British units spread out on the maritime plain.

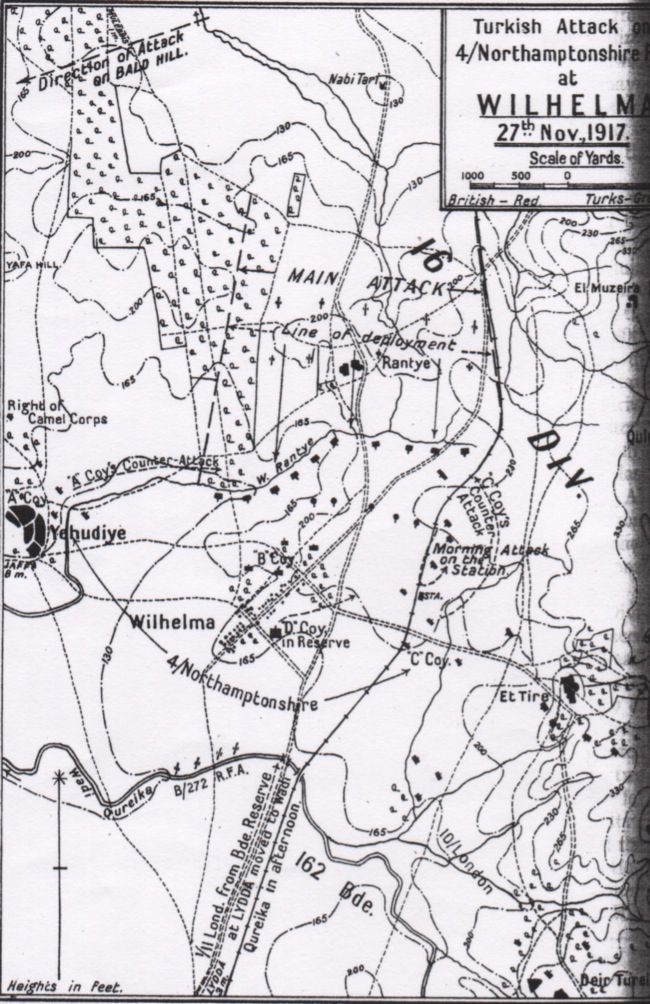
Turkish attack the 4th Northamptonshire Regiment at Wilhelma on 27 November 1917

The Ottoman forces on the maritime plain advanced in strength in the region of Wilhelma (a German colony) to attack the 162nd Brigade (54th Division). Here a strong attack was launched against the EEF units holding Wilhelma Station. The attackers also established a strong firing line in the Wadi Rantye. By 17:00 these coordinated attacks had progressed to within 400 yards (370 m) of the British infantry line, where they were held while both flanks of the Ottoman force were attacked and driven in, forcing the attackers back to Rantye. On the left the 54th (East Anglian) Division a company of the 4th Battalion (Imperial Camel Brigade) was attacked at Bald Hill, south of Mulebbis and pushed back 500 yards (460 m) off the hill, which was later targeted by EEF artillery. Also on 27 November, the Yeomanry Mounted Division's advanced post at Zeitun on the western end of the Beitunia Ridge was attacked by a larger Ottoman force. They managed to hold off the attackers until 28 November, when the division was forced to withdraw from Sheik Abu ez Zeitun and Beit Ur el Foqa as well as Zeitun.

On 28 November, the Australian Mounted Division (less the 5th Mounted Yeomanry Brigade) which had been resting at Mejdel from 19 to 27 November, was ordered to return to the Judean Hills. The 4th Light Horse Brigade's march to Berfilya was diverted straight on to Beit Ur el Tahta. When they reached south of Beit Ur el Tahta, the brigade covered a dangerous, isolated position, out of contact with either the 8th or the 6th Mounted Brigades. By nightfall, the line, was held by the 60th (London) Division, the 8th Mounted , the 22nd Mounted, the 7th Mounted, the 156th Brigade, the 155th Brigade, the 4th Light Horse Brigade still out of touch with the 8th and 6th Mounted Brigades. This line was "hard pressed" after night fall when the Ottoman attackers launched a "very fierce bombing attack" reopening a gap in the EEF line. These operations were supported on 28 November by a combined force of the British and Australian Nos. 1 and 111 Squadrons, which attacked the Tul Keram aerodrome with aerial bombing. This attack was repeated the following morning and evening after German planes bombed the Julis aerodrome and hit No. 113 Squadron's orderly room.

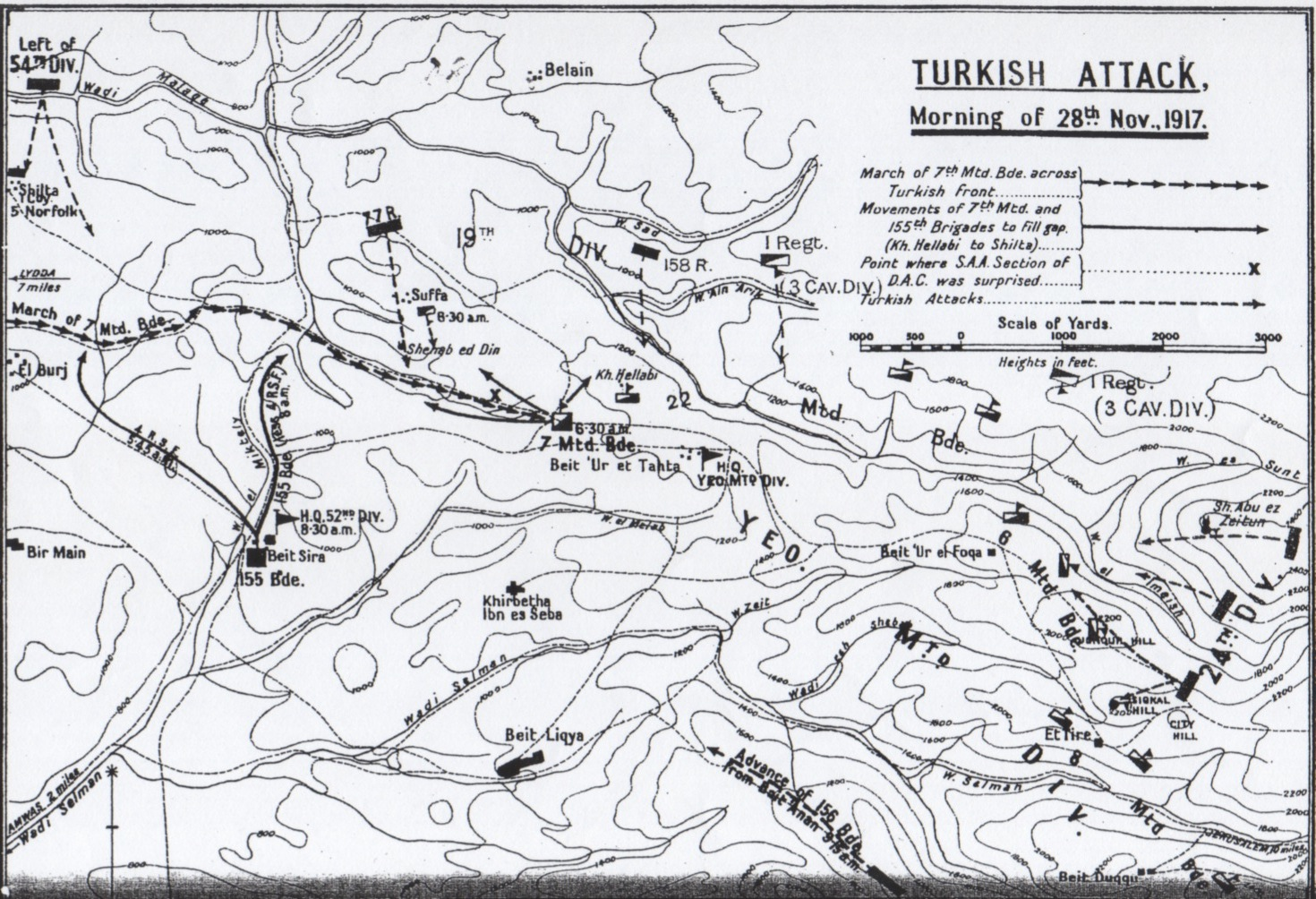
Detail of Ottoman counterattack on morning of 28 November 1917

As the Ottoman counterattacks continued on 29 November, the 5th Mounted Yeomanry Brigade was ordered to rejoin its division, while the 10th Light Horse Regiment (3rd Light Horse Brigade) remained under orders of the 60th (London) Division. The 3rd Light Horse Brigade marched on to Berfilya 2 miles (3.2 km) west of el Burj. (Note: A quarter of the men of these light horse brigades took the horses to the rear. Each man had four horses to look after day and night and as these "led horses" were prime targets for aerial bombing, it was both solid and dangerous work.[Hamilton 1996, p. 91]) The Yeomanry Mounted Division was relieved by the 74th (Yeomanry) Division; two brigades of infantry were substituted for four brigades of cavalry resulting in a sixfold increase in the number of rifles. With additional reinforcements from the dismounted Australian Mounted Division, these proved sufficient troops to hold all subsequent Ottoman counterattacks.

At about 01:00 on 1 December a battalion of the Ottoman 19th Division, armed with hand grenades, launched a series of attacks at Beit Ur el Tahta against the 157th Brigade, and north east of El Burj against the 3rd Light Horse Brigade. After two attempts at Beit Ur el Tahta, they succeeded in driving a severely weakened infantry company of the 5th Battalion, Highland Light Infantry, 52nd (Lowland) Division, off 200 yards (180 m) of the ridge in front of the village, but by 04:30 they had reoccupied the position. The 8th Light Horse Regiment north east of El Burj withstood four separate onslaughts by enemy forces armed with stick grenades. A squadron of the Royal Gloucestershire Hussars of the 5th Mounted Yeomanry Brigade, attached to the 3rd Light Horse Brigade was rushed up to fill gaps in the line, and the Hong Kong Battery came into action. They were reinforced by the 4th Battalion, Royal Scots Fusiliers with a small group of bombers from Beit Sira, which arrived just as Ottoman soldiers launched a new assault. The British bombing party attacked Ottoman bombers and after a fierce engagement forced them back. The Ottomans continued desperately to attack and another company of the 4th Scots Fusiliers came up. Combined with the steady fire of the dismounted 3rd Light Horse Brigade, the shower of bombs from the Fusiliers forced the Ottoman soldiers to fall back and dig in. At dawn they surrendered. (Note: One Scotsman furiously roared as he hurled one Mills grenade after another: "They mairched us a hunnder miles! (Tak' that, ya ...!) An' we've been in five fechts! (Anither yin, ya ... !) And they said we wur relieved! (Tak' that, ya ...!) And we're ott oor beds anither nicht! (Swalla that, ya ...!)." [quoted in Woodward, pp. 145–6]) Ottoman counterattacks launched at Nebi Samwill on 1 December were repulsed, with the Ottoman Seventh Army suffering heavy losses. The Ottoman Army had failed to win any ground as a result of their counterattacks, and the advancing British troops were successfully replacing the worn out XXI Corps, holding well entrenched positions close to Jerusalem, with the fresh XX Corps.

== Jerusalem 2–9 December ==
By 2 December the relief of the XXI Corps by the XX Corps was completed. And both side began to adjust and improve their lines, leaving insecure or hard to defend places. The fresh EEF soldiers increased the strength of their line, creating a powerful concentration. Over four days the 10th (Irish) and 74th (Yeomanry) Divisions extended their positions, while the extended position held by the 60th (London) Division was decreased. Although it is claimed that on 3 December the Ottoman Army had abandoned their counterattacks and that fighting in the Judean Hills ceased, as a consequence of units of the 74th (Yeomanry) Division recapturing Beit Ur el Foqa, during a night time attack, the position was impossible to hold. At daylight they found they were overlooked by Ottoman positions on higher ground. Bombing and hand-to-hand fighting continued all morning, and the Yeomanry infantry battalion was forced to withdraw, suffering 300 casualties.

=== Mott's Detachment ===
The 53rd (Welsh) Division (XX Corps), with the Corps Cavalry Regiment and a heavy battery attached, remained on the Hebron road north of Beersheba, after that place was captured on 31 October and during the advance up the maritime plain. Now they came under direct orders from General Headquarters (GHQ) and became known as Mott's Detachment. The detachment was ordered to advance north along the Beersheba to Jerusalem road and by 4 December had arrived 4.5 miles (7.2 km) south of Hebron. Here two Australian light armoured cars from a Light Armoured Motor Battery (LAMB), drove in from the north. They reported no Ottoman units in Hebron, so the detachment continued their advance to the Dilbe valley that night. (Note: A Light Car Patrol raided Beit Jibrin and Beit Netief, and the Wadi es Sunt. Unable to retire, they drove on towards Solomon's Pools and south to Hebron and on towards Beersheba. [Powles pp. 166–7])

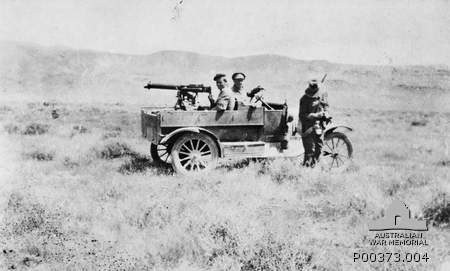
A Model T Ford Utility with a Vickers .303 machine gun mounted on a tripod

Chetwode commanding XX Corps, ordered Mott to advance as quickly as possible and get into a position 3 miles (4.8 km) south of Jerusalem, by the morning of 8 December. Mott's advanced guard moved tentatively during the night of 5 December to 3 miles (4.8 km) north of Hebron, and by 7 December had come finally found an Ottoman rearguard defending Bethlehem 4 miles (6.4 km) from his objective. Bad weather prevented the advance continuing. So Mott's Detachment was not able to cut the road from Jerusalem to Jericho, and get into position in time to cover the right flank of the 60th (London) Division, although Mott managed to capture Solomon's Pools to the south of Bethlehem by the evening of 7 December.

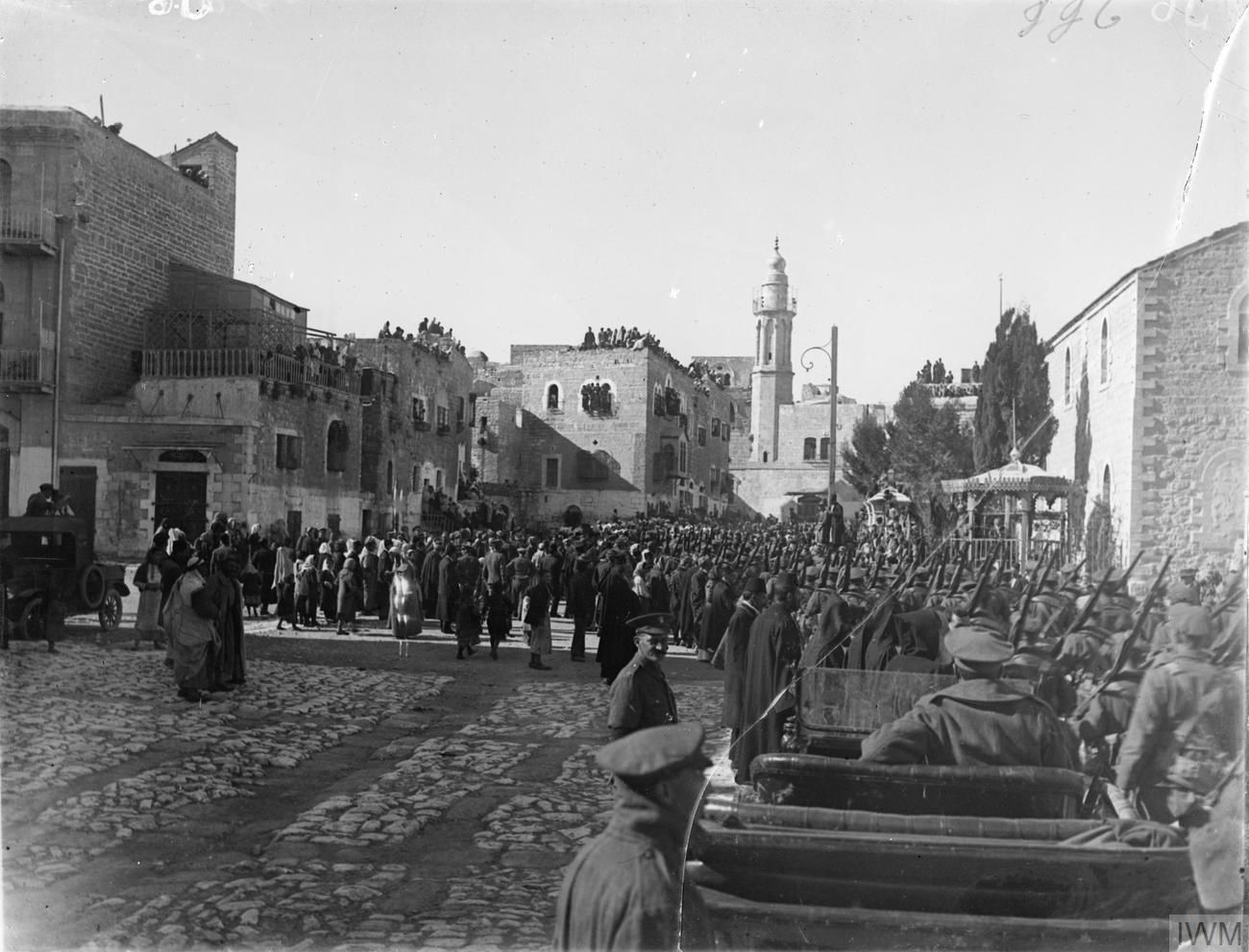
The 4th Battalion, Sussex Regiment march through Bethlehem. Their infantry division, the 53rd (Welsh) Division, occupied Bethlehem on the night of 9 December

About noon on 8 December, Chetwode ordered the detachment to get moving. Mott finally attacked his main objective at Beit Jala at 16:00. It was not until the evening that they continued their advanced to find the way completely clear of Ottoman defenders. At the crucial moment, Mott's Detachment had been unable to cover the southern flank of the 60th (London) Division, forcing the Londoners to pause during daylight, as enfilading fire would have made their advance extremely costly.

=== Surrender ===
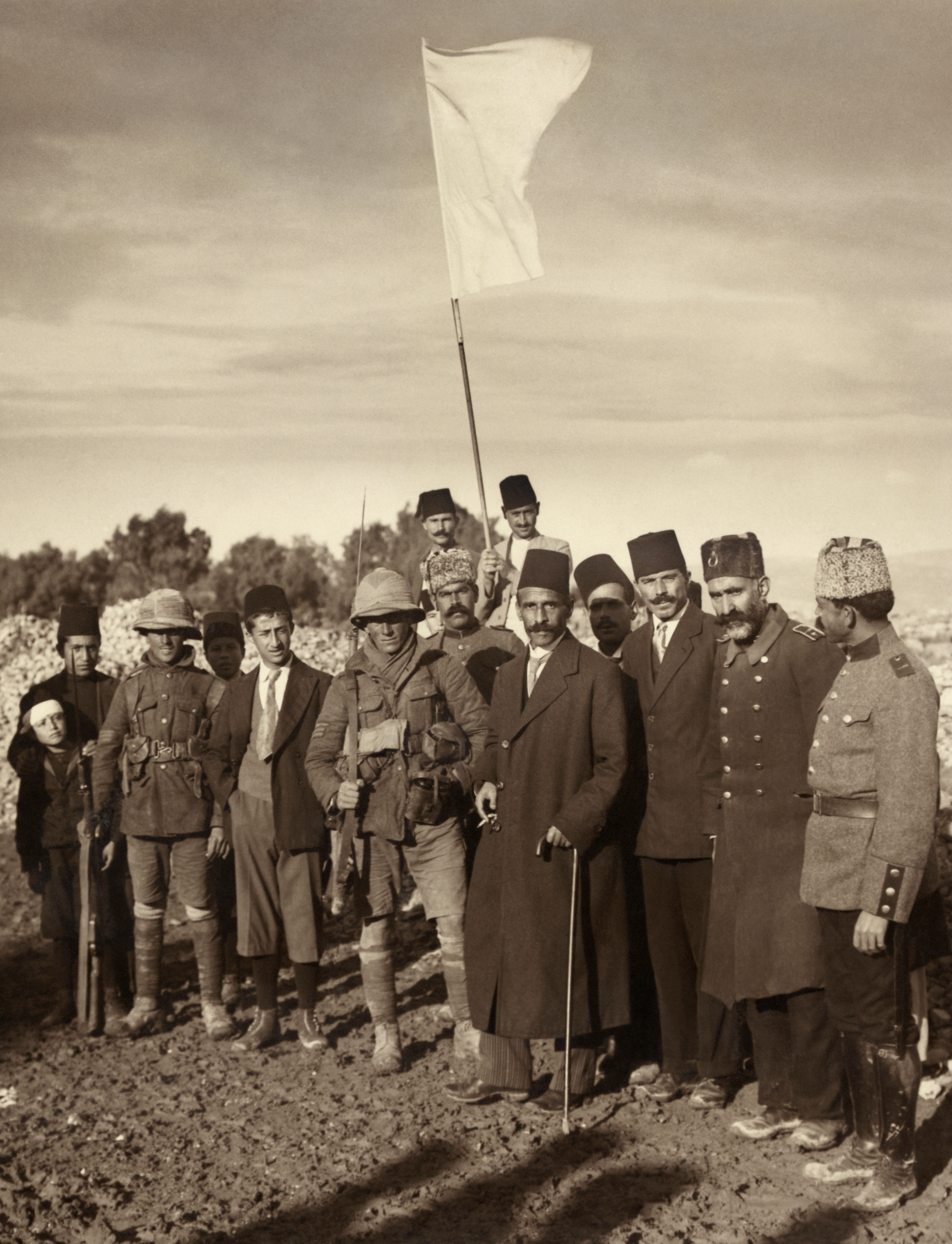
The surrender of Jerusalem to the British, 9 December 1917

During almost continuous rain on 8 December, Jerusalem ceased to be protected by the Ottoman Empire. At the same time Chetwode launched the final advance taking the heights to the west of the city. The Ottoman Seventh Army retreated during the evening and the city surrendered the following day. Jerusalem was almost encircled by the EEF, although Ottoman Army units briefly held the Mount of Olives on 9 December. They were attacked by units of the 60th (London) Division which captured the position the following afternoon.

== Casualties ==
From 31 October to the capture of Jerusalem the Ottoman armies suffered 25,000 casualties.

A total of 14,393 battle casualties were evacuated to Egypt from the EEF along with 739 Australians during October and November 1917. These Australian wounded were mainly treated in the 1,040 beds of No. 14 Australian General Hospital at the Abbassia Barracks, Cairo. Here 754 surgical cases, the heaviest battle casualties admissions of the Sinai and Palestine campaign, were admitted during November. These had been evacuated by ambulance trains from the British casualty clearing stations at Deir el Belah and Imara. During the same period it received 720 medical cases, which rapidly increased during the following months.

== Aftermath ==
=== Capture of Arsuf 20–21 December ===
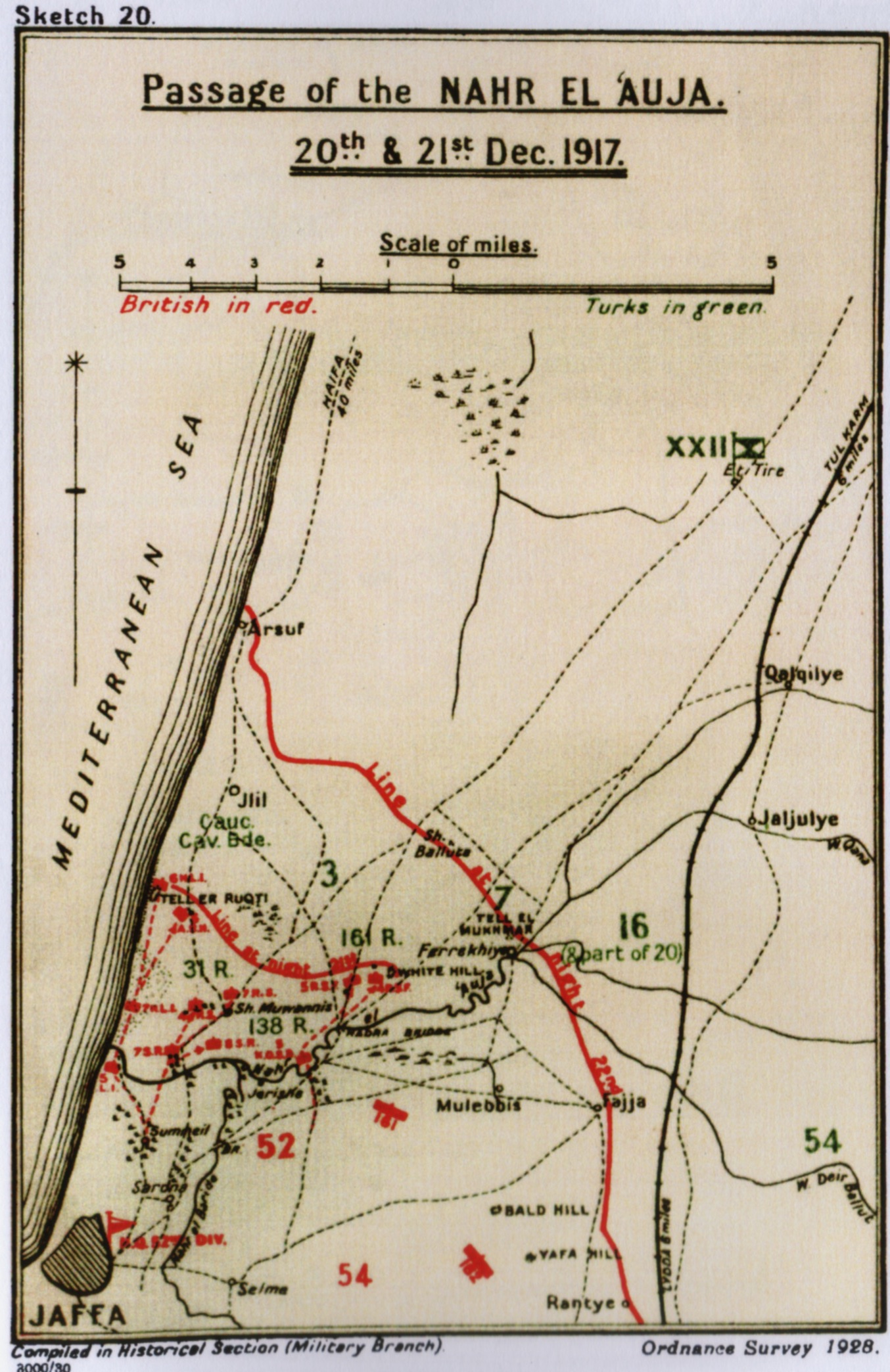
Falls' Sketch Map 20 Passage of the Nahr el Auja

Allenby planned to establish a defensive line running from the Mediterranean Sea to the Dead Sea. With both flanks secured, the line could be held with reasonable security. In order to establish this line, it was necessary to push the 3rd and 7th Infantry Divisions of the Ottoman Eighth Army back away from the Nahr el Auja 4 miles (6.4 km) north of Jaffa on the Mediterranean coast. After the first attempt between 24 and 25 November, this second attempt in the same area was officially designated a subsidiary battle during the Jerusalem Operations. One historian thought these operations "hardly merit in size or importance the name 'Battle of Jaffa'." Now, three infantry divisions of the XXI Corps began moving their units into position on the coastal plain on 7 December. The 75th Division was on the right with the 54th (East Anglian) Division in the centre and the 52nd (Lowland) Division on the coast. They relieved the New Zealand Mounted Rifles Brigade, which had been heavily involved in the first attempt to capture the Nahr el Auja, fought shortly after their victory at the Battle of Ayun Kara.

Military operations resumed a fortnight after the surrender of Jerusalem with the final EEF attack of this campaign. Preparations were, however, complicated by the sodden state of the low and swampy ground on the southern banks of the Nahr el Auja where the attack would be launched, and the river was swollen by rain which had fallen on 19 and 20 December. From Mulebbis to the sea the river was between 40–50 feet (12–15 m) wide and 10–12 feet (3.0–3.7 m) deep except for the ford at the mouth known as Sheik Muanis. To the north of the river two prominent spurs ran down to the river from a series of sandy ridges. These overlooked the damaged stone bridge at Khurbet Hadrah to the east and the village of Sheik Muannis, near Jerisheh to the west where a mill dam bridged the stream. The Ottoman Eighth Army held strong commanding positions covering all the possible crossing places which had been used by the attackers in November. They held both spurs in addition to a post opposite the ford at the mouth of the Nahr el Auja. They also held a line extending east of Khurbet Hadrah which crossed to the south bank of the river to include Bald Hill and Mulebbis.

All three infantry brigades of the 52nd (Lowland) Division managed to cross the River Auja on the night of 20/21 December, completely surprising the defenders who surrendered without firing a shot. Temporary bridges were subsequently built so the infantry's artillery could cross the river. On 23 December the 52nd (Lowland) and 54th (East Anglian) Divisions moved up the coast a further 5 miles (8.0 km), while the left of the advance reached Arsuf 8 miles (13 km) north of Jaffa, capturing key Ottoman defensive positions. They were supported by guns on warships. Shortly afterwards, the 52nd (Lowland) Division was ordered to France.

=== Defence of Jerusalem 26–30 December ===
Officially recognised by the British as one of three battles which made up the "Jerusalem Operations", this Ottoman attack occurred between 26 and 30 December 1917. The 10th (Irish), the 60th (London), and the 74th (Yeomanry) Divisions with support from infantry in the 53rd (Welsh) Division (XX Corps) fought the Seventh Ottoman Army's 24th, 26th and 53rd Divisions (III Corps).

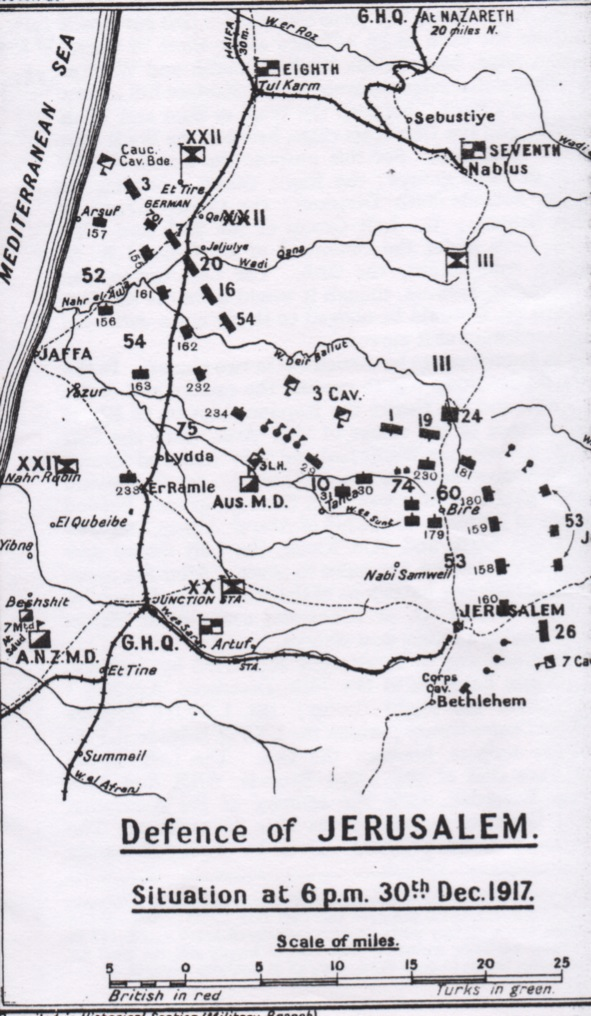
Falls' Sketch Map 21: Defence of Jerusalem. Situation on 30 December 1917 at 1800

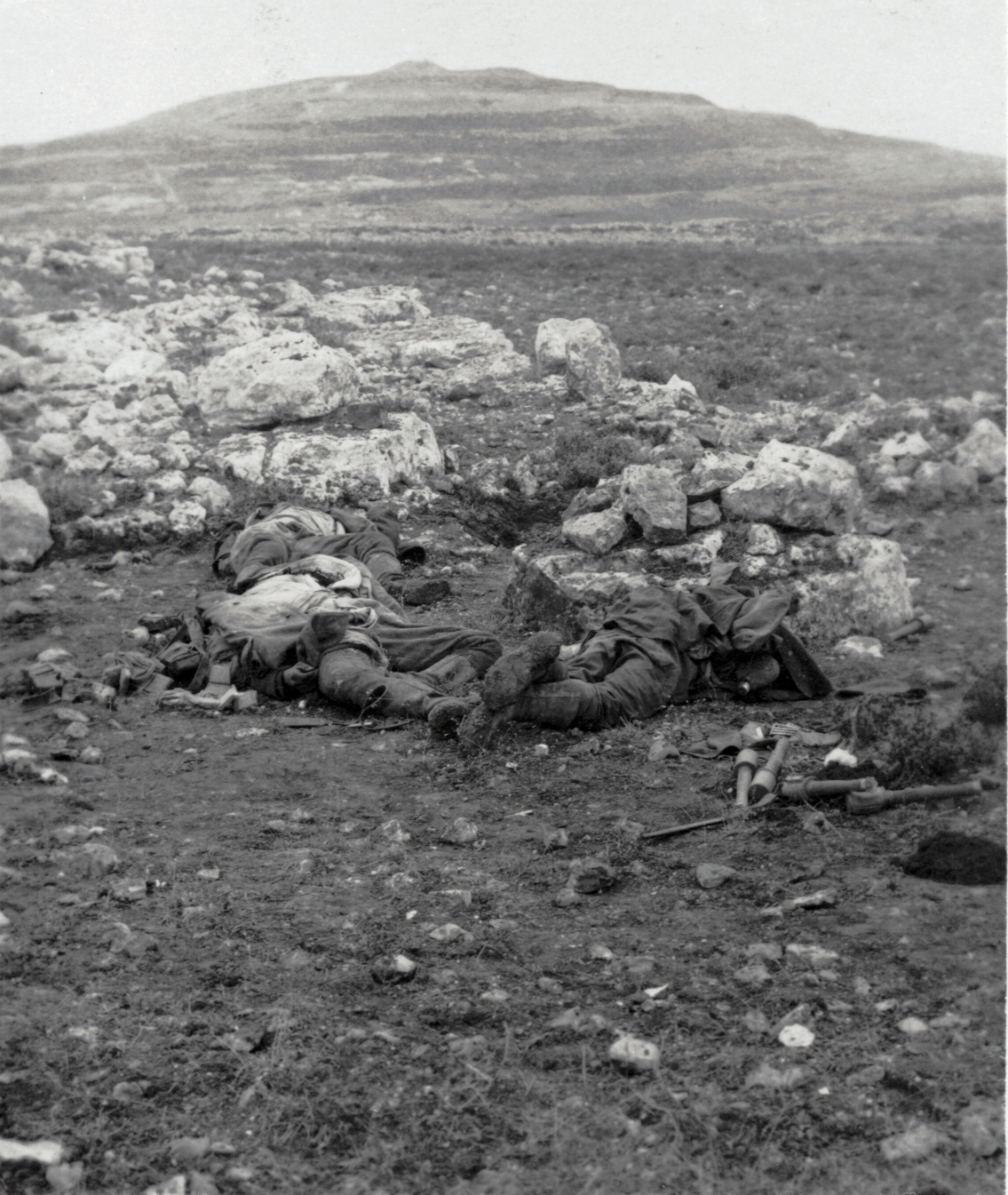
Dead Ottoman soldiers at Tel el Ful in 1917

After the Ottoman evacuation, Jerusalem remained within range of Ottoman artillery, and with the opposing sides in such close proximity, there was still the risk of counterattack. An offensive to push the Ottoman Army further northwards away from the city was planned for 24 December 1917, but was delayed due to bad weather. So the EEF was prepared for battle when the Ottoman Army launched their counterattack at 01:30 on 27 December. This fell on units of the 60th (London) Division holding the Nablus road. The initial objective of the Ottoman attack, was a line of villages, including Nebi Samweil 1 mile (1.6 km) in front of their starting positions. Their focus was towards Tell el Ful, a hill east of the Nablus road about 3 miles (4.8 km) north of Jerusalem defended by the 60th (London) Division. This Ottoman attack on Tell el Ful initially drove the British outposts back and captured several important places. However, the engagement continued for two days and was ultimately unsuccessful. A general EEF infantry advance on a 12-mile (19 km) front moved their front line 6 miles (9.7 km) northwards on the right and 3 miles (4.8 km) on the left. They pushed the whole line along the Nablus road to beyond Ramallah and Bireh by 30 December. Final objectives were gained and the line along the whole front secured. In the middle of February 1918 the line was extended eastwards to Jericho in the Jordan Valley, when it was finally secured on the Dead Sea.

=== Summation of offensive ===
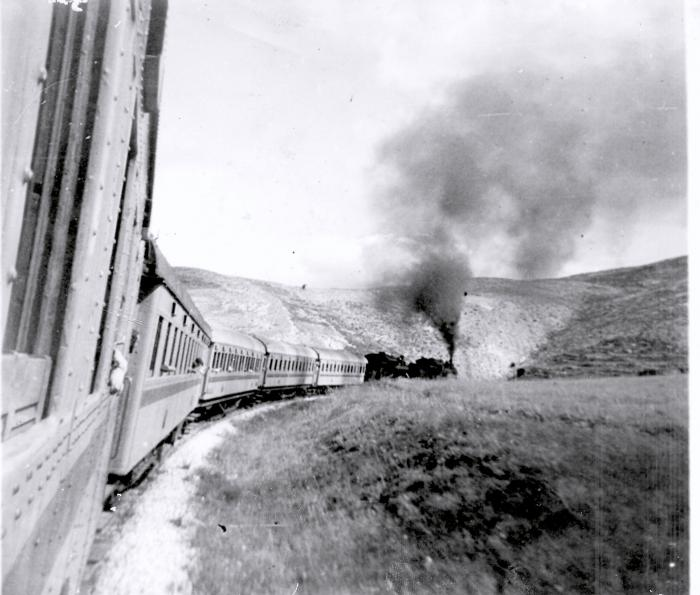
Jaffa to Jerusalem train climbing the Judean hills east of Lydda in 1947

The EEF had evolved into a "genuinely imperial all–arms force" and the offensive was a "nearly ideal instance of the proper use of all arms in combination." The scale of the enormous territorial gains of the Southern Palestine offensive, contrasted with the British offensive on the Western Front at Cambrai. Fought in Flanders from 20 to 30 November, it ended with heavy losses and no territorial gains. The French army was still recovering from a serious mutiny, while the Italians were defeated at the Battle of Caporetto, and Russia was out of the war following the Bolshevik Revolution. Allenby's advance by comparison made considerable territorial gains, helped secure Baghdad and the oilfields at Basra in Mesopotamia, encouraged the Arab Revolt, and inflicted irreplaceable losses on the Ottoman Army. These substantial victories of the EEF's campaign from October to December 1917 resulted in the first military defeat of a Central Power, which led to a substantial loss of enemy territory. In particular the fighting from 31 October to 7 November against the Ottoman Gaza–Sheria–Beersheba line resulted in the first defeat of strongly entrenched, experienced and, up until then, successful Ottoman armies which were supported by artillery, machine guns and aircraft.
