= XXI Corps Cavalry Regiment =

British cavalry unit in Mandatory Palestine

- XXI Corps' formation badge
- Active: 21 August 1917–25 July 1919
- Country: United Kingdom
- Branch: British Army
- Type: Yeomanry
- Size: 3 Squadrons
- Part of: XXI Corps
- Engagements: Capture of Wadi el Hesi; Junction Station; Battle of Jaffa; Battle of Tell 'Asur; Battle of Sharon; Pursuit to Tripoli

XXI Corps Cavalry Regiment (21st Corps Cavalry Regiment) was a composite mounted regiment of the British Army made up from separate squadrons of Yeomanry cavalry. It served under XXI Corps Headquarters in Palestine during World War I, seeing action at the Third Battle of Gaza with the seizure of Wadi el Hesi and Junction Station, and at the Battles of Jaffa and Tell 'Asur. After reorganisation in the summer of 1918, XXI Corps participated in the Battle of Megiddo, when it broke through the Turkish lines at the Battle of Sharon, and its cavalry regiment led the pursuit up the coast of present-day Lebanon. The regiment reached Tripoli before hostilities ended.

== Origin ==
When General Sir Edmund Allenby took over command of the Egyptian Expeditionary Force (EEF) in Palestine in the Summer of 1917 he completely reorganised it. XXI Corps (21st Corps) Headquarters was formed on 12 August at Deir al-Balah, taking responsibility for the left section of the EEF's line in front of Gaza City. A cavalry regiment was formed for the corps by taking over three divisional cavalry squadrons:

XXI Corps Cavalry Regiment

- Regimental Headquarters (RHQ)
- A Sqn 1/1st Duke of Lancaster's Own Yeomanry (DLOY) transferred from 53rd (Welsh) Division 23 August
- A Sqn 1/1st Hertfordshire Yeomanry (Herts) transferred from 54th (East Anglian) Division 26 August
- C Sqn 1/1st Queen's Own Royal Glasgow Yeomanry (QORGY) transferred from 52nd (Lowland) Division 21 August

All three squadrons were from pre-war Yeomanry regiments of the Territorial Force, the British Army's part-time auxiliaries. These had recently been strengthened by the issue of Hotchkiss machine guns at a scale of one per Troop. The regiment was commanded by a Regular Army officer, Lieutenant-Colonel G.G.M. Tyrrell (5th Royal Irish Lancers), who had been adjutant of the Bedfordshire Yeomanry on the outbreak of war.

== Service ==
Unlike on the Western Front, where trench lines precluded most mounted action, a corps cavalry regiment in the EEF had an active and varied career: A Sqn DLOY was described as being involved in 'numerous skirmishes, outpost affrays, and pursuits'. On first formation, the new regiment continued the reconnaissance patrols in front of Gaza that the three squadrons had been coordinating between them since June.

=== Wadi el Hesi ===
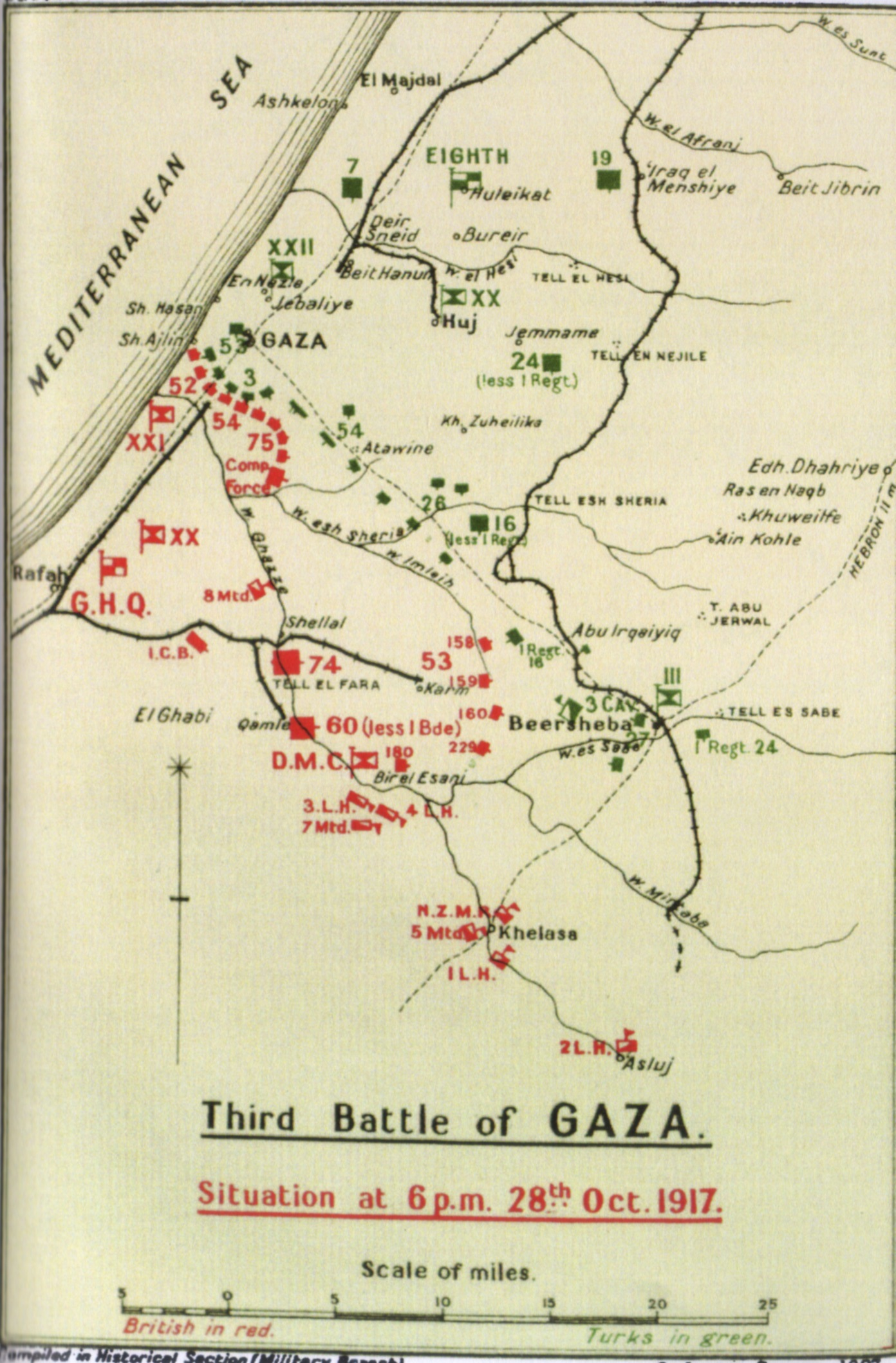
Dispositions at the start of the Third Battle of Gaza.

Arrangements for a resumption of the EEF's advance into Palestine were completed in autumn 1917 and the Third Battle of Gaza was launched on 31 October with the Capture of Beersheba. During the early operations XXI Corps fixed the enemy's attention with an artillery bombardment and holding action against Gaza. Threatened with having their line rolled up from the direction of Beersheba, the Turks evacuated Gaza on the night of 6/7 November. It was now vital for XXI Corps to pursue vigorously and capture Wadi el Hesi before the Turks could occupy the strong position there. 52nd (L) Division was brought up from corps reserve to carry this out in conjunction with the Imperial Service Cavalry Brigade (composed of Imperial Service Troops from the Princely states of India), which GHQ released to XXI Corps for the task. XXI Corps Cavalry led the two brigades: the DLOY with 157 Bde and the rest of the regiment with the IS Cavalry Bde. The going was rough, but by noon the Herts Yeomanry and QORGY squadrons had taken Beit Lahi, halfway to the wadi. However, the IS Cavalry Bde had a lengthy approach march, came under fire as soon as it emerged from Gaza, and found the village and railway station of Beit Hanoun in front to be stoutly defended by Turkish machine gun detachments. The IS Cavalry Bde made contact with XXI Corps Cavalry at Beit Lahi, but was unable to take Beit Hanoun that day and withdrew to water its horses. Meanwhile, the DLOY squadron had moved with the advance guard of 52nd (L) Division (157th (Highland Light Infantry) Brigade, 264th Brigade, Royal Field Artillery and 410th (Lowland) Field Company, Royal Engineers) along the seashore under the cover of the cliffs. Their task was to cross the Wadi el Hesi near its mouth and consolidate a position on the opposite bank. The defenders here had little stomach, and the force was able to move quickly, the infantry swinging inland and establishing themselves on the crestline after dark, while the engineers developed a water supply in the bed of the wadi.

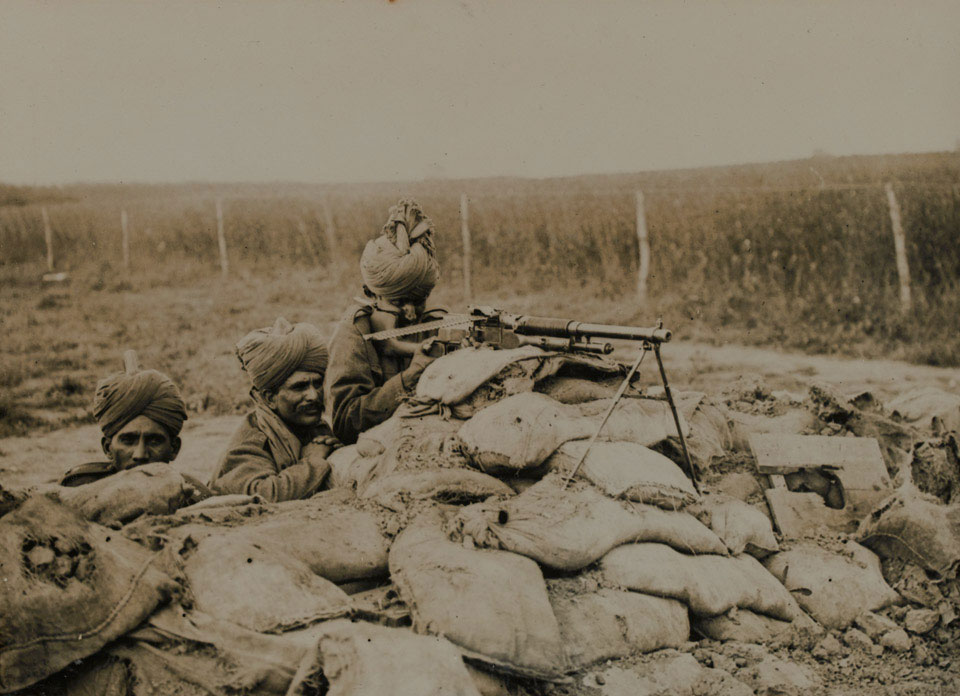
A Hotchkiss machine gun (this example crewed by Indian troops).

Next day (8 November), while 52nd (L) Division attacked inland (eastwards) against Sausage Ridge the IS Cavalry Bde was also ordered to advance eastwards to make contact with the Australian Mounted Division (AMD), cutting off the retreating Turks between them. The brigade left its bivouacs at 02.45 and renewed its advance on Beit Hanoun with the two squadrons of XXI Corps Cavalry leading. Once again the advance guard was held up by Turkish machine gunners in the village and an indecisive long-range action ensued. About noon, however, the enemy began to retreat. The Corps Cavalry galloped over the ridge east of the village and brought its Hotchkiss machine guns into action against the retiring Turks, shooting down the team of a 150 mm howitzer that was subsequently captured. (This incident was later pictured in The Illustrated London News.) A patrol from the Herts squadron passed between the Turkish positions and made contact with the AMD's units advancing along the Gaza–Beersheba road.

=== Junction Station ===
On 9 November XXI Corps Cavalry was placed in reserve while the IS Cavalry Bde continued the pursuit. That evening the Herts squadron was detached to act as divisional cavalry for 75th Division, which was moving on Junction Station. At 08.00 on 13 November the division advanced with 232nd Bde (accompanied by No 3 Trp Herts) on the left, and 233rd Bde (and No 1 Trp Herts) on the right. As well as its usual reconnaissance and flank guard duties, No 1 Trp had the task of keeping contact between 233rd Bde and the AMD. This flank was open and the brigade came under long range machine gun and shrapnel shellfire until the Australians began their own advance in the afternoon. The Turks later made a determined counter-attack that had to be driven back. At nightfall the division bivouacked about 4 miles (6.4 km) short of Junction Station. Next morning 234th Bde took up the advance, but No 2 Trp was unable to join it because of heavy shell and machine gun fire. It therefore joined itself to 232nd Bde, which secured the area to the south and kept in contact with the Australians. About 08.30 Junction Station, with its stores, machinery and water supply, fell unopposed into the hands of 234th Bde.

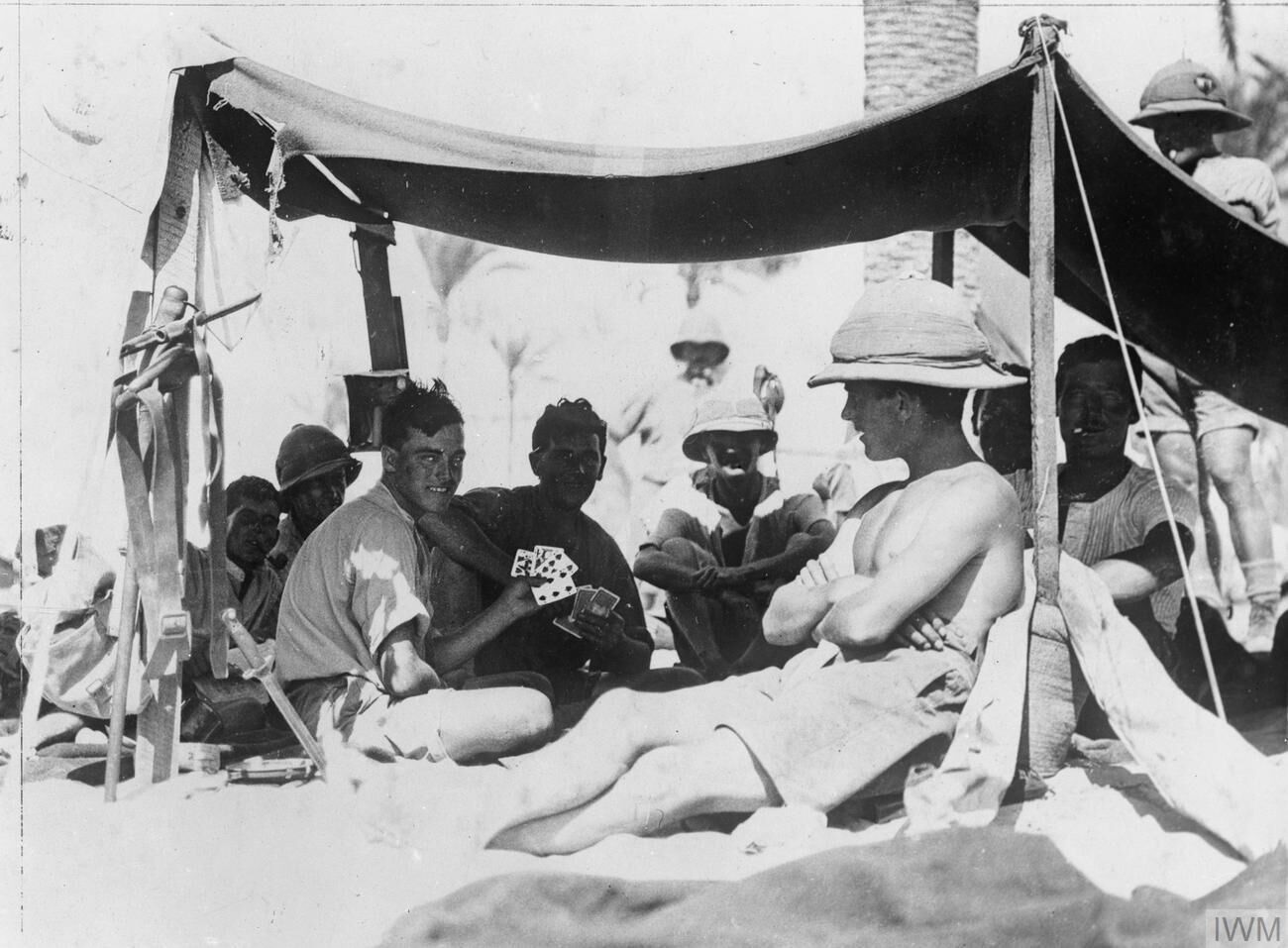
Yeomanry resting in Palestine, November 1917.

As the rest of the EEF advanced into the Judaean Hills, XXI Corps continued in the coastal plain, 54th (EA) Division coming up from Gaza to rejoin it. Once the division was in line, the Herts Sqn was switched to it, patrolling the divisional front. On 28 November No 4 Trp was sent to Ramla to deal with rioting among the population. Once XXI Corps had re-assembled it resumed its advance in late December. 54th (EA) and 75th Divisions attacked on 20–22 December during the Battle of Jaffa. The attack was made in heavy rain and many of the troops, including the cavalry regiment, were still wearing their summer uniforms. When the main attack went in on 22 December 54th (EA) Division found the enemy already in retreat. No 2 Troop of the Herts with an additional Hotchkiss gun was ordered to maintain contact with the Turks and followed them through Fajja, across the Wadi Abu Leja towards the ruined castle at Ras al-Ayn. Although suffering casualties from shellfire, the troop was able to show that the Turks had established a strong position. XXI halted along this line until the spring of 1918. Patrols continued until 28 December when XII Corps Cavalry concentrated in the rear areas.

=== Tell 'Asur ===
XXI Corps returned to the offensive in March 1918 during the Battle of Tell 'Asur, carrying out an advance of about 5 miles (8.0 km) on 12 March with 54th (EA) and 75th Divisions and the Corps Cavalry. The overwhelming British artillery in this sector ensured that the objectives were secured with light casualties. XXI Corps Cavalry was up to its establishment in men (the yeomanry had received reinforcement drafts from their 2nd Line regiments at home) but were understrength in horses. With detachments at Corps HQ, the Herts Sqn was temporarily reduced to a 21-man rifle troop, a Hotchkiss troop with all four machine gun detachments, and a pack troop providing first line transport. The corps took up a line from Arsuf on the coast into the hills, which reduced the gap between XXI and XX Corps to about 3.5 miles (5.6 km) that could be patrolled by XXI Corps Cavalry from a base at Aboud.

=== Reorganisation ===
Following the German Spring Offensive on the Western Front in March 1918, the EEF was obliged to send reinforcements to the British Expeditionary Force. This resulted in a long pause in operations while the EEF was reorganised. XXI Corps Cavalry Rgt was withdrawn from the line on 28 March and concentrated near Jaffa before moving to Sarona on 16 April. It introduced a 'duty squadron' system by which each squadron in turn provided orderlies at corps and divisional HQs and other tasks, leaving two squadrons ready for operations. The regiment also underwent reorganisation. After serving on the Western Front for a year, B Sqn 1/1st Herts Yeomanry had returned to Egypt in July 1917. Since then it had served as the depot squadron in the Cavalry Wing of the Imperial School of Instruction at Zeitoun. However, in May 1918 it exchanged with C Sqn QORGY in XXI Corps Cavalry Regiment (though Major Alexander Glen-Coats of the QORGY remained with XXI Corps Cavalry). Shortly after B Sqn's arrival Lt-Col Tyrrell ordered all three squadrons to remove their distinctive helmet flashes, apparently to foster a single regimental identity. (Note: However, about this time the Hertfordshire Yeomanry in Palestine adopted a distinctive button incorporating the regimental badge of a 'Hart Trippant' in place of the army's universal pattern; this seems never to have been officially sanctioned.)

=== Megiddo ===
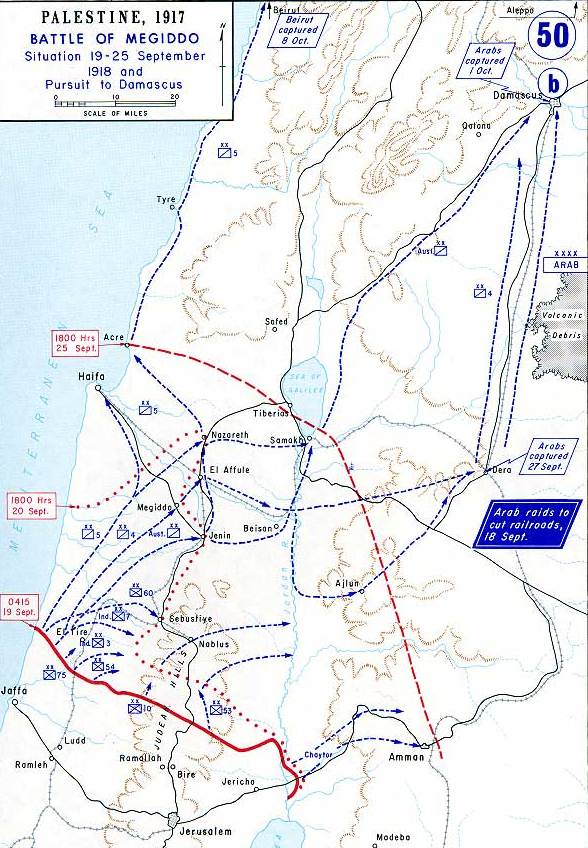
Progress of the Megiddo offensive

XXI Corps Cavalry Rgt remained at Sarona for almost five months while the EEF completed its reorganisation and prepared for an autumn offensive. XXI Corps, with five infantry divisions and a cavalry brigade, had the task of breaking through Turkish trench lines that in places were5 miles (8.0 km) deep. However, it had overwhelming superiority in artillery. The Megiddo Offensive was launched on 19 September. During the Battle of Sharon (or Battle of Tulkarm) XXI Corps broke through and overwhelmed the right of the strong Turkish defence system from Biddya to the sea. While the other two squadrons of the corps cavalry were scattered in small detachments, two troops of A Sqn Herts were kept together. With the armoured cars of 2nd Light Armoured Motor Battery (2nd LAMB), under the command of 75th Division, they cut through and in a flanking move forced the evacuation of Et Tire, the division's objective. The squadron and 2nd LAMB then came under 60th Division as it took over the lead in the afternoon and made for Tulkarm. A Squadron Herts escorted the division's attached heavy artillery (102nd Brigade, Royal Garrison Artillery, consisting of one horsedrawn and one tractor drawn battery) as it caught up with the division.

Next day the corps began a pursuit over the Plain of Sharon, with A Sqn Herts as advance guard to 179th Bde of 60th Division as it advanced up the Nablus road, which was littered with the debris of broken-down and destroyed Turkish transport. The mounted patrols followed the Turks as they retreated from one position to another, taking prisoner many Turkish stragglers and entering 'Anebta with an abandoned German field hospital. During the night the squadron pushed a patrol further along the Nablus road until it located the Turks holding a tactically strong position. The following morning the squadron and 2nd LAMB supported 5th Australian Light Horse Brigade (5th ALH) as it advanced up the road captured Nablus. Action on XXI Corps' front then ceased while the rest of the EEF kept up the pressure on the Turks. The Official History described the part played by XXI Corps in the battle as 'one of the most overwhelmingly successful operations of the war'.

=== Syria ===
After the Battle of Sharon XXI Corps' divisions were employed on salvage work and road repair. By late September the EEF was closing in on Damascus and Allenby ordered XXI Corps to secure the coast and ports of Ottoman Syria. 7th (Indian) Division, which had already shown remarkable powers of marching, was ordered to march to Beirut along the coast road, and all three squadrons of XXI Corps Cavalry Rgt were concentrated at Acre to accompany it. On 1 October, the force was organised into three columns: Column A under the command of Lt-Col Tyrrell consisted of XXI Corps Cavalry Rgt, 2nd LAMB, and a single infantry company of 1/8th Gurkha Rifles, supported by about 550 camels of P Company, Egyptian Camel Transport Corps, carrying five days' ration. The Indian Sapper companies and Pioneer battalion followed with Column B. On 2 October the division was confronted by the Ladder of Tyre, a narrow ancient track consisting of steps cut into the cliff. There was no alternative route. Extensive engineering work would be required to make it passable for wheeled vehicles, with the danger of the whole cliff shelf falling into the sea. The task of preparing the half-mile (800 m) track took two-and-a-half days, but was successfully completed so that 2nd LAMB's armoured cars and the 60-pounder guns of 15th Heavy Bty, RGA, could get through. Even before the work was completed, XXI Corps Cavalry Rgt led its horses up the steps in single file and then rode on to Tyre on 4 October. Here the Royal Navy landed supplies for the columns. On 6 October the advanced troops secured Sidon, where further supplies were landed. A Squadron Herts and 2nd LAMB were left on internal security duties in Sidon while the rest of Column A pushed on towards Beirut under Maj Glen–Coats. Column B reached Sidon on 7 October and next day A Sqn and the armoured cars moved up quickly and caught up with the rest of the column as it approached the city. The citizens welcomed them, handing over 500 Turkish prisoners. Corps HQ was quickly established in the Deutscherhof' Hotel.

On 11 October Column A was suddenly ordered to occupy Tripoli, 65 miles (105 km) further on, by the evening of 13 October. This was beyond the capabilities of the infantry or the camels, so XXI Corps Cavalry (riding selected horses), 2nd LAMB and the signals detachment set off early on 12 October. The column covered 35 miles (56 km) on the first day and by midday on 13 October had reached Abu Halka. Here the road made a detour inland, which the armoured cars had to follow, but the cavalry took the more direct coastal track until it reached a deep, dry wadi as darkness fell. The rear squadron turned back, but the two leading squadrons descended into the wadi, leading their horses in single file, then rode through the moonlight to enter the city. They were welcomed by the citizens, who provided food and supplies. The regiment had covered some 300 miles (480 km) since 18 September. XXI Corps Cavalry and 2nd LAMB held Tripoli until 18 October, when the leading infantry brigade of 7th (Indian) Division arrived, followed by the camel transport the next day.

== Disbandment ==
Hostilities in the theatre ended on 31 October when the Armistice of Mudros came into force. XXI Corps Cavalry Rgt returned to Beirut. Demobilisation of XXI Corps Cavalry Rgt began in mid-January, with precedence given to those men who had served at least four years with the EEF. However, in early February A and B Sqns Herts were selected to form part of the Army of Occupation in Turkey. They returned to Beirut in mid-April and amalgamated as a composite squadron. XXI Corps Cavalry Regiment continued to decline in numbers as demobilisation proceeded, and it was formally disbanded on 25 July 1919.

== Battle Honours ==
XXI Corps Cavalry Regiment had no permanent existence, and the British Army did not award battle honours to sub-units, but because two squadrons of 1/1st Herts Yeomanry served together in XXI Corps Cavalry Regiment from May 1918, the parent regiment was awarded the relevant honours for actions after that date (even though B Sqn was not actually engaged at Megiddo): Megiddo, Sharon and Damascus (ie the operations in Syria), together with the Theatre Honour Palestine 1918.

== See also ==
- List of corps cavalry regiments of the British Army 1916–19
- XXI Corps (United Kingdom)
- Sinai and Palestine campaign
