= Capture of Wadi el Hesi =

November 1917 military operation

Capture of the Wadi el Hesi
- Part of the Middle Eastern theatre of World War I
Date	7–9 November 1917
Location	Wadi el Hesi seven miles (11 km) north of Gaza, Palestine
Result	British Empire victory

Belligerents
British Empire	Ottoman Empire; German Empire

Commanders and leaders
(United Kingdom) Edward Bulfin	(German Empire) Friedrich Freiherr Kress von Kressenstein

Units involved
XXI Corps	Eighth Army

Casualties and losses
700	Unknown

The Capture of Wadi el Hesi and the associated Sausage Ridge, began during the evening of 7 November 1917, was fiercely fought for during 8 November and not cleared until the early hours of 9 November, at the beginning of the pursuit phase of the Southern Palestine Offensive in the Sinai and Palestine Campaign during World War I. The advancing British Empire units of the Egyptian Expeditionary Force (EEF) were held by rearguard units of the withdrawing Ottoman Empire units of the Yildirim Army Group, holding a strategically strong position to the north of Gaza.

After the EEF victory at the Battle of Beersheba, the Beersheba to Gaza line was broken in consequence of a series of attacks, at Tel el Khuweilfe, Hareira and Sheria and Gaza. The Ottoman 7th Division, one of the retreating Ottoman Army units, established a defensive line on the northern side of the Wadi el Hesi which included Sausage Ridge. (Note: Not to be confused with Sausage Ridge to the south east of Gaza, which had formed part of the Gaza to Beersheba defensive line, from before the Second Battle of Gaza and during the Stalemate in Southern Palestine. (See the second battle's article for Falls Map 14 showing Central operations on 17 April 1917 File:FallsMap14detGaza.jpeg)) After the wadi was fairly quickly crossed late on 7 November, Sausage Ridge protecting the road and railway along which the retreating Ottoman columns were traveling, was attacked on 8 November by the EEF's 52nd (Lowland) Division. However, supported by an Ottoman cavalry attack on the British infantry's northern flank, the Ottoman rearguard strongly defended the ridge all day and most of the night, until it was finally captured early on 9 November. By then the rearguard had successfully withdrawn along with the withdrawing Ottoman columns.

== Background ==
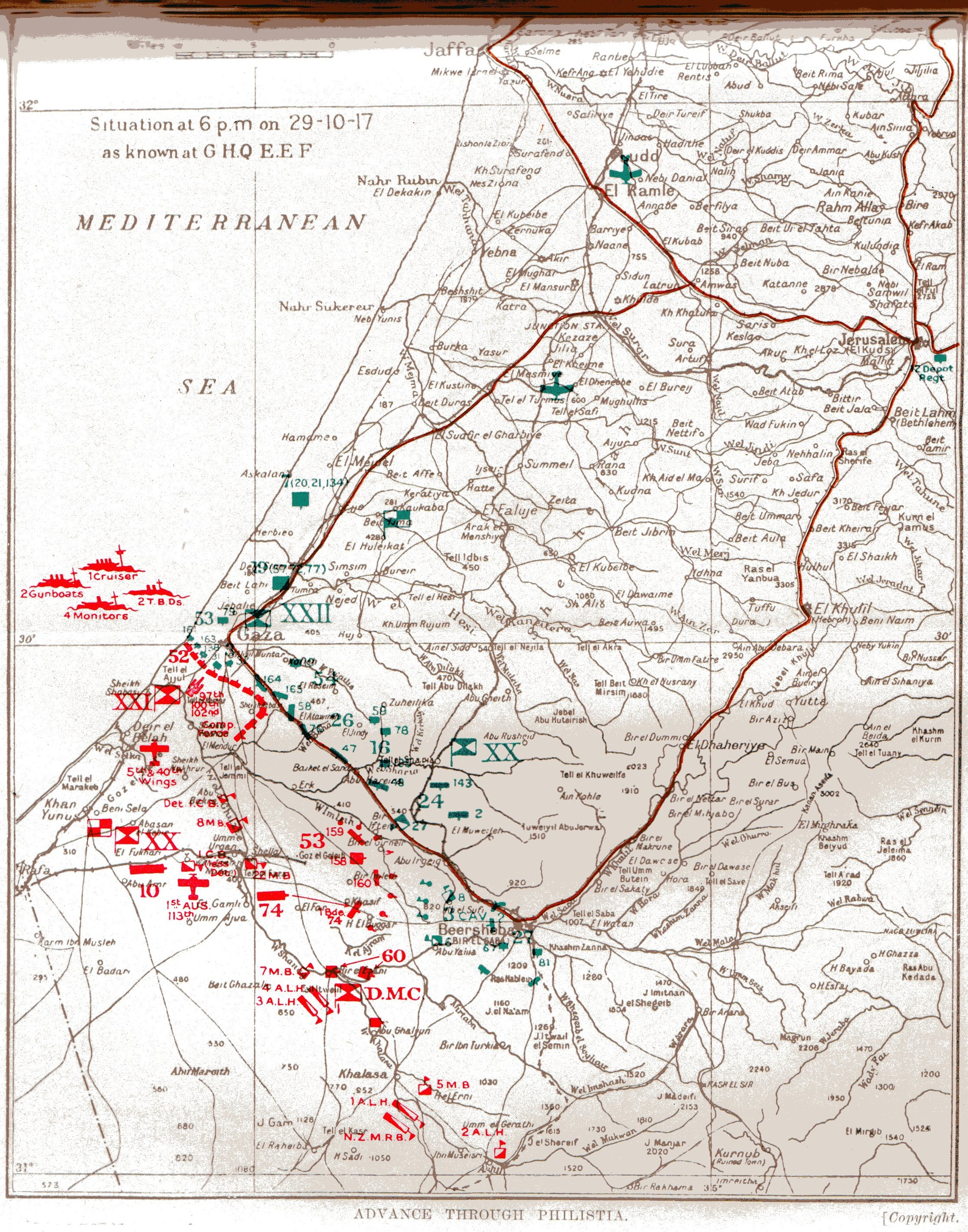
EEF GHQ situational map for 18:00 on 29 October 1917 showing the Wadi el Hesi stretching inland from the Mediterranean Sea to the north of Gaza

After the capture of Beersheba on 31 October by General Edmund Allenby's forces, between 1 and 7 November strong Ottoman rearguards at Tel el Khuweilfe in the southern Judean Hills, at Hareira and Sheria on the maritime plain, and at Gaza close to the Mediterranean coast, held the Egyptian Expeditionary Force (EEF) in heavy fighting. Towards the end of the week the Ottoman Army was able to withdraw mainly at night in good order, under cover of effective rearguards. The Ottoman XXII Corps had not been defeated at Gaza, but conducted a skillful, tactical retreat from the town, demonstrating both operational and tactical mobility. The Gaza garrison withdrew in three detachments, the Ottoman 53rd Division moved eastwards, delaying the pursuit by Desert Mounted Corps, the Ottoman 3rd Division occupied a strong rearguard position at Beit Hanun, while the Ottoman 7th Division established the Wadi el Hesi line of defences. However, in conjunction with the captures in the centre of the line at Sheria, the occupation of Gaza enabled a swift direct advance northwards, preventing a strong consolidation of the Wadi el Hesi rearguard position. This wadi was the second of the major watercourse on the Palestine coast, flowing parallel with, and 12 miles (19 km) north of the Wadi Ghuzzee.

== Prelude ==
Falls Sketch map 6 shows Ottoman defences from Gaza to Tel el Sheria at 18:00 on 6 November with the evacuation of Gaza indicated from En Nezle and Jebaliye towards Huj, Beit Hanun and Wadi el Hesi, and the Ottoman Palestine railway. Also shows Atawineh, Kh Zuheilika and Jemmame.

On 7 and 8 November rearguards of the Ottoman Eighth Army, delayed the EEF's advance by Lieutenant General Edward Bulfin's XXI Corps and Lieutenant General Harry Chauvel's Desert Mounted Corps.

=== Ottoman withdrawal from Gaza ===
Gaza was defended during the third battle for Gaza, by the XXII Corps commanded by Refet Bey with headquarters at Jebaliye holding the strongly fortified positions around Gaza:

- the 53rd Division's 3,100 rifles had held from the Mediterranean shore to the eastern side of Gaza (veteran of the Second Battle of Gaza),
- the 3rd Division's 3,698 rifles on their left (veteran of the First and Second Battles of Gaza), and
- the 7th Division's 2,886 rifles had been in Eighth Army reserve at Deir Sineid. The corps had been supported by 116 guns, six large naval guns, and several batteries of 150mm howitzers. The rifle figures were as at 30 September 1917. Not mentioned are the machine guns, which progressively replaced 25% of the rifles in each infantry battalion, from 10 August 1917. These divisions would have been included in a general activation of Stoßtruppen style assault troops, across the whole Ottoman Army. On 1 September 1917, Enver Pasha ordered assault battalions and detachments to be established in the Yildirim Army Group.

After the limited fighting during the third battle, the Ottoman XXII Corps was not defeated, skillfully conducting a tactical retreat from Gaza, during which the corps demonstrated both operational and tactical mobility.

==== Gaza to Beersheba road ====
At 01:00 on 7 November during the EEF occupation of Gaza the 233rd Brigade of the 75th Division (XXI Corps) took control of Outpost Hill on the eastern outskirts of Gaza without meeting any opposition. Only individual Ottoman riflemen opposed their occupation of Green Hill and the Labyrinth at 05:00, and by 07:00 the 233rd Brigade had patrols on Ali Muntar. However, on their right, the 234th Brigade (75th Division) was delayed by Ottoman units in strength armed with machine guns, defending Beer trench and Road Redoubt on the Gaza to Beersheba road. These rearguards targeted the EEF rear during the day, delaying the hand over of the transport, from XX Corps to the XXI Corps.

Tank and Atawineh Redoubts were defended by strong Ottoman rearguards, which targeted the increasing numbers of EEF infantry, with their artillery. The EEF units advanced behind Atawineh, Road and Tank Redoubts' flanks and eventually occupied them by nightfall. Allenby had decided by noon on 7 November, to leave them as "their garrison must surrender, and I am not wasting men by assaulting them." During the morning of 8 November, a detachment of the 10th (Irish) Division (XX Corps) advanced along the road to Gaza from Beersheba, to find touch with the Composite Force of the XXI Corps near Atawineh, having passed the undefended Hairpin redoubt on Sausage Ridge.

==== Ottoman 53rd Division ====
After evacuating Gaza the Ottoman 53rd Division advanced eastwards towards Huj, marching across the front of the advancing cavalry, to stop the threatened breakthrough by Desert Mounted Corps, and to cover the retreating columns. The superior strength of this Ottoman division, temporarily halted and drove in the advance squadrons of the 2nd Light Horse Brigade and the 7th Mounted Brigade on their right, but withdrew towards the Wadi el Hesi when threatened by the 1st Light Horse Brigade. However under cover of this attack, the Ottoman 16th and 26th Divisions were able to withdraw, without being harassed.

==== Wadi el Hesi defences ====
A second group of the retreating Gaza garrison had marched through the previous night, to gain distance and time to establish light field defences on a strong position just north of the Wadi el Hesi, seven miles (11 km) north north east of Gaza. In the sand dunes and in the cultivated area nearby, they constructed a series of short trenches. Behind these defences they resisted the EEF advance all day, making a determined stand on the Wadi el Hesi. It was towards this line held by the 7th Division, that the 53rd Division had withdrawn, while the 3rd Division held Beit Hanun.

Rising in the Judean Hills, the Wadi el Hesi stretched west to enter the sea seven miles (11 km) north of Gaza. When not flowing, water was available all year round, either in large pools, or just below the surface. On the northern bank, in the small village of Herbie, in the areas of cultivation, and in the sand dunes, the Ottoman rearguard constructed lines of trenches, which made the most of the natural strengths of the area. However, this second line was not nearly as strong as the Gaza to Beersheba line, and was vulnerable to attack from the south over the sand dunes.

The aim of this rearguard was to delay the EEF advance until the arrival of the winter rains. In the mud, the Ottoman Army was hopeful that it could to hold the EEF until spring, when reinforcements from the Baghdad campaign in Mesopotamia were expected to arrive in Southern Palestine, along with Ottoman divisions from Salonika. German battalions might also become available following Russia's withdrawal from the war.

=== EEF pursuit ===
On 7 November, the 54th (East Anglian) Division (XXI Corps) had taken over garrison duties in Gaza, while their 162nd Brigade advanced through the gardens and fields to the main road, north of the town. While it has been suggested the 54th (East Anglian) Division subsequently occupied the Wadi el Hesi, due to supply problems this division was forced to remain at Gaza. Although dumps of rations, ammunition and engineer stores had been formed in concealed positions in the XXI Corps area before the Third Battle of Gaza, the corps was not in a position to move any distance. Almost all of their transport except ammunition tractors had been transferred to the XX Corps and the Desert Mounted Corps for their attacks during the Battle of Beersheba.

The XXI Corps ordered the 52nd (Lowland) Division to take up a line from the Jaffa road north of Sheikh Radwan to the sea on the northern outskirts of Gaza, and the 157th Brigade (52nd Division) with a squadron of the XXI Corps Cavalry Regiment on their right, began the infantry pursuit by passing through the 54th (East Anglian) Division to advance along the shore of the Mediterranean Sea, to occupy Sheikh Hasan by 12:15. The 157th Brigade was also supported by the 264th Brigade RFA (with footed wheels) and the 413th Field Company Royal Engineers. By 16:00, these troops were seen marching along the coast towards the mouth of the Wadi el Hesi, the nearest likely defensive line north of Gaza.

==== Beit Hanun ====
On the eastern side of Gaza, the 75th Division (XXI Corps) commanded by Major General Philip Palin, with the Imperial Service Cavalry Brigade attached, had been ordered to exploit any potential breakthrough. The cavalry brigade, which had been carrying out patrol duties based at Tel el Jemmi, during fighting for the Gaza to Beersheba line, rode through the ruins of Gaza at 09:00. They arrived at Beit Hanun at 13:00, where the Imperial Service Cavalry Brigade encountered part of the Gaza garrison defending a strong rearguard position on a ridge 1.5 miles (2.4 km) south-east of Beit Hanun. (Note: The Imperial Service Cavalry Brigade had served in the Force in Egypt during the defence of the Suez Canal including the Raid on Suez Canal early in 1915. Subsequently they served on the EEF lines of communication before coming under the direct command of Allenby. [Grainger 2006 pp. 128–9])

The Hyderabad and Mysore Lancers had advanced through Jebaliya to link with the Glasgow, Lancashire, and Hertfordshire squadrons of the XXI Corps Cavalry Regiment, holding the high ground at Beit Lahl 5 miles (8.0 km) north of Gaza, to threaten the Ottoman flank. At about noon Ottoman munitions at the railhead near Beit Hanun were blown up. Early in the afternoon, the 12th Light Horse Regiment (4th Light Horse Brigade, Australian Mounted Division) rode to the north-west to give the Imperial Service Cavalry Brigade a message, as the cavalry brigade had been out of contact with XX Corps and the Desert Mounted Corps. They met one mile (1.6 km) east of Beit Hanun at 14:45. (Note: Falls and Paget state touch was gained at 15:00. [Paget 1994 Vol. 5 p. 187, Falls 1930 Vol. 2 p. 137]) The light horsemen delivered orders for the Imperial Service Cavalry Brigade to "try and close the gap" by attacking the Ottoman rearguard on the Wadi el Hesi near Tumra to the north of Beit Hanun. (Note: Falls implies the 12th Light Horse Regiment combined with the Imperial Service Cavalry Brigade but according to the 12th Light Horse Regimental War Diary they back rode to Huj. [12th Light Horse Regiment War Diary November 1917 AWM4-10-17-10, Falls 1930 Vol. 2 p. 137]) (See sketch map showing the advance by the Imperial Service Cavalry Brigade and the 52nd (Lowland) Division on 7 November 1917).

While the Corps Cavalry Regiment captured Beit Lahia, the Hyderabad Lancers advanced at 15:00 to capture the ridge west of Beit Hanun at Sheikh Munam, but the village was strongly defended by numerous Ottoman machine gun detachments. Despite meeting considerable resistance, they advanced to the ridge overlooking Beit Hanun from the east, capturing the position, twenty-three prisoners, a 5.9-millimetre (0.23 in) gun / 150-millimetre (5.9 in) howitzer and a large quantity of ammunition. They also captured the water pumping machinery intact; however, this ran on gas made from charcoal which had to be converted before it could be used. As a consequence, the regiments were forced to withdraw back to Jebaliye for water. (Note: The three squadrons of XXI Corps Cavalry and the Imperial Service Cavalry Brigade were forced to retire back to Gaza for supplies and water. [Paget 1994 Vol. 5 p. 187]) At 16:55 the Ottoman rearguard was reported to still be holding Beit Hanun, with concentrations of forces at Al Majdal (also known as el Mejdel), the ancient place of Ashkelon and Beit Duras. By evening lancers from the Imperial Service Cavalry Brigade had pursued the Ottoman force as far as Tumrah and Deir Sineid.

== Battle ==
Wadi el Hesi attacks by 155th and 157th Brigades on 8 November

On the far left of the EEF pursuit, the 157th Brigade (52nd Division) and attached cavalry, artillery and engineers, had advanced seven miles (11 km) north of Gaza along the shore covered by cliffs, to within one point five miles (2.4 km) of the Ottoman army entrenchments on the banks of the Wadi el Hesi, the sand dunes giving good cover to their approach from the south. By dusk on 7 November, the 157th Brigade had reached and crossed the Wadi el Hesi near its mouth.

On 8 November, the Royal Scots Fusiliers and King's Own Scottish Borderers battalions of the 155th Brigade (52nd Division), crossed the wadi behind the Highland Light Infantry battalions of the 157th Brigade (52nd Division) and "extended their line northwards ... into an area of sand–dunes bounded by the coast on the left and a ridge, called by the mapmakers 'Sausage Ridge', behind which the road and railway ran." Sausage Ridge extended from the southern edge of the village of Burbera, southwards for three miles (4.8 km) towards Deir Sineid, ending nearly on the right bank of the Wadi el Hesi, three point five miles (5.6 km) inland from the coast. The ridge was held in strength by the Ottoman 7th Division rearguard which held the EEF advance in determined fighting for most of the day, with the division successfully covering the majority of the retreating columns as they withdrew north along the road and railway to the east, and behind Sausage Ridge. (Note: The 54th Division has also been identified as the Ottoman division defending Sausage Ridge. [Erickson 2001 p. 173])

At 05:30 the 155th and 157th Brigade were ordered to capture Sausage Ridge. They were to attack the ridge to the north west of Herbie and not far from Ras Abu Ameire, with the support of the 164th Brigade RFA, and unknown to Brigadier General John Pollok-M'Call commanding the 155th Brigade, naval guns on monitors off the mouth of the Wadi el Hesi.

=== Ras Abu Ameire Ridge ===
The 1/5th Highland Light Infantry followed by the 1/7th (Blythswood) Bn, Highland Light Infantry (157th Brigade), did not begin their attack on Ras Abu Ameire, a high dune east of the main position until dark on 7 November. By 20:20 they had not been strongly resisted, capturing their objective along with a machine gun and some rifles, but no prisoners.

Only the southern portion of the Ras Abu Ameire Ridge had been captured the previous night by the 157th Brigade. Accordingly, on 8 November Brigadier General Hamilton Moore commanding the 157th Brigade, had been told his brigade's contributions would be defensive. While the 155th Brigade was to advance to attack Sausage Ridge on his left, Moore extended his flank north along the Ras Abu Ameire Ridge to attack the Ottoman rearguard holding the northern part of the ridge, which had clear targets on the advance of the 155th Brigade. Although the rearguard strongly resisted, the 7th Highland Light Infantry cleared most of the Ras Abu Ameire Ridge, while the leading battalion of the 155th Brigade, the 5th Kings Own Scottish Borderers completed the job by 10:30.

=== Sausage Ridge ===
When Pollok-M'Call commanding the 155th Brigade, reconnoitred the proposed battlefield from Ras Abu Ameire Ridge, he found Sausage Ridge was 1,000 yards (910 m) further away from Ras Abu Ameire, was more than two hundred feet (61 m) high in places, with a glacis fortification constructed on the western face. In addition to these very formidable Ottoman defences, he also found the ridge extended further north than maps had indicated, and previously appreciated, and as a consequence the approach by 155th Brigade would expose these British infantry units, to an attack from the north by hostile units from Ashkelon. Bulfin, commanding the XXI Corps, arrived at Major General John Hill's headquarters of the 52nd (Lowland) Division, and despite the newly appreciated physical strength of the position, "the attack must be carried out as ordered." By 16:00 all units were in position for the attack but only one hour of daylight remained in which to advance three miles (4.8 km).

==== 157th Brigade ====
Holding the southern sector, the 157th Brigade was ordered at 13:30 to attack "with its whole strength", leaving no units to strengthen their northern flank. The 157th Brigade was to attack through Herbie to capture the southern edge of Sausage Ridge overlooking the Ottoman Palestine railway which ran from Beit Hanun to Junction Station. The 5th Argyll and Sutherland Highlanders and the 5th Highland Light Infantry were to extend "along the southern end of the Ras Abu Ameire Ridge" advancing frontally, while on the southern bank of the Wadi el Hesi, the 6th Highland Light Infantry was to cross the wadi southwest of Sausage Ridge, in a turning movement. The 157th Brigade, advanced unopposed until they were three-quarters of the way from Herbie towards the Sausage Ridge, at dusk they suffered considerable casualties from heavy rifle and machine gun fire.

The 157th Brigade went on to attack the southern end of Sausage Ridge, and succeeded in gaining ground as darkness fell. By 18:00 the leading troops of the Argyll and Southern Highlanders and 5th Highland Light Infantry reached the foot of the hill and charged straight up to gain the crest. Under very heavy Ottoman machine gun fire, strengthened by minenwerfer short range mortars, small groups of British soldiers "came to close quarters" with the Ottoman troops, fighting each other with bombs and bayonets. An Ottoman battalion counterattacked a few minutes later driving the British off the ridge. After rallying, they were driven off four times when many British were killed with the bayonet. After losing all their officers and NCOs the survivors reformed and returned to the attack. However, the Ottoman defenders were also armed with hand grenades and trench mortars.

After suffering heavy losses the 5th Highland Light Infantry were ordered to "stand fast", while the 7th Highland Light Infantry, the reserve battalion moved through them to take up the attack, with the 5th Highland Light Infantry forming the reserve. Meanwhile, the turning movement of the 6th Highland Light Infantry, which had advanced slowly in close formation through sand, was becoming effective as the defenders had not been prepared for a flank attack, on this south-western end of Sausage Ridge. At 20:50 a general attack along the whole line captured the position with the bayonet, except for rearguards on the heights two hundred yards (180 m) away. Strong officers' patrols captured this higher ground and the whole position was cleared by 03:30 on 9 November. The 157th Brigade lost more than 400 casualties.

==== 155th Brigade ====
The 1/4th and 1/5th Royal Scots Fusiliers and the 1/4th and 1/5th King's Own Scottish Borderers (155th Brigade) crossed the Wadi el Hesi and passed through the 157th Brigade's Highland Light Infantry to extend the line northwards, bringing the 155th Brigade into the sand dunes of the Mediterranean coast. At 12:30 the 155th Brigade formed up on the Ras Abu Ameire Ridge with their right three-quarters mile (1.2 km) to the north-east on a 1,200 yards (1,100 m) front with the 5th Kings Own Scottish Borderers on the right, the 4th Royal Scots Fusiliers in the centre, the 5th Royal Scots Fusiliers on the left, and the 4th Kings Own Scottish Borderers in reserve. The Corps Cavalry Regiment guarded their left, northern flank, while the Imperial Service Cavalry Brigade covered their right flank, attacking the Ottoman rearguard positions on the Wadi el Hesi near Tumra. The attack was launched at 14:20 under heavy hostile artillery fire from four field batteries, two field howitzers, a 150-mm howitzer and two 100-mm high-velocity guns. These guns could not be located by the 264th Brigade RFA or the monitors off the coast.

The 5th Royal Scots Fusiliers (155th Brigade) on the northern flank of the attacking force, approached the line of its objectives about 1,000 yards (910 m) too far to the left, as a consequence of the threatening advance of a squadron of Ottoman cavalry from Ashkelon, when fire from machine guns in the dunes, "completely enfiladed the advance." An infantry company forced the machine gunners back, but a gap opened between the 5th and the 4th Royal Scots Fusiliers. Before the gap was closed, counterattacks were launched from the front by two battalions, supported by mountain howitzers and machine guns, and from Ashkelon by Ottoman cavalry. One company of the 5th Royal Scots Fusiliers slowed the cavalry but was gradually forced back until the left flank of the brigade was back at its starting point on Ras Abu Ameire Ridge, compelling the right flank and the whole brigade to withdraw. At this time 285 casualties were suffered by the British infantry. This counterattack, which had developed about 16:00, forced the infantry brigade to face north to meet the attack. Here they remained awaiting reinforcements.

== Aftermath ==
The Ottoman rearguards had succeeded in covering the Gaza garrison's withdrawal for two full days, and the 1,000 strong rearguard also escaped capture. They were seen by the Scots as they reached the top of Sausage Ridge, marching north in full regulation formation, "under no pressure at all." The British infantry battalions had captured about twelve prisoners but suffered seven hundred casualties. (Note: Grainger was critical of the operation, saying "with some imagination" the British could have outflanked the rearguard on Sausage Ridge, and "saved their several hundred killed and wounded." [Grainger 2006 p. 156]) However, by the evening of 8 November, all the Ottoman positions which had made up the Gaza to Beersheba line had been captured and the Eighth Army was in full retreat.

The pursuit by Desert Mounted Corps across the Southern Palestine plain, which eventually ended some fifty miles (80 km) north, began during the morning of 8 November, after the Ottoman line of defence had been broken in the center at Sheria.

Allenby wrote on 8 November: The battle is in full swing. We have driven the Turks N. and N.E. and my pursuing troops are ten miles beyond Gaza, and travelling fast. A lot of Turks are cut off – just N.E. of Gaza. I don't know if they will be caught; but there is no time to waste in catching them. They pooped off a huge explosion this morning – presumably ammunition. My army is all over the place, now on a front of 35 miles ... My flying men are having the time of their lives; bombing and machine gunning the retreating columns ... I fancy that Kress von Kressenstein is nearing the Jaffa-Jerusalem line, himself.

— Allenby letter dated 8 November 1917

Late in the afternoon of 8 November, twenty-eight British and Australian aircraft had flown over Huj, the headquarters of the Ottoman force, in bombing formation targeting German and Ottoman aerodromes, railway junctions, dumps, and troops marching in close formation, with bombs and machine guns. Arak el Menshiye was raided twice during the day when two hundred bombs were dropped, forty-eight hit ten hostile aircraft still on the ground. The next day, Et Tine was bombed, when at least nine hostile aircraft were damaged. Virtually continual aerial attacks were made on railway stations, troops on the march and transport, while a German aircraft was shot down near the Wadi el Hesi.

Before midnight on 8 November GHQ EEF issued instructions for the XXI Corps to send the 75th Division to join the 52nd (Lowland) Division in the pursuit. Their next objective was the Julis–Hamama line 20 miles (32 km) northeast of Gaza. Although the Composite Force took over the 75th Division position at Sheikh Abbas on 9 November, the return of transport delayed this division's advance. While the 75th Division waited for the return of their 75th Divisional Train, the Imperial Service Cavalry Brigade withdrew to Beit Hanun for supplies, food and water, and the 54th (East Anglian) Division was unable to advance from Gaza as the division's transport had been transferred to the 52nd (Lowland) Division. While Desert Mounted Corps advanced northwards, the XX Corps could not move as its transport had been transferred to the XXI Corps. The 10th (Irish) and the 74th (Yeomanry) Divisions withdrew to Karm to get supplies, the 60th (London) Division could not move from Huj as it also lacked transport. Further, while the Ottoman 19th Division retreated, the 53rd (Welsh) Division, along with the New Zealand Mounted Rifles Brigade and the Imperial Camel Brigade, remained on the front line in the Tel el Khuweilfe area. (Note: Grainger states the 53rd (Welsh) Division moved back to Beersheba. [Grainger 2006 pp. 157–8])

On 9 November the 52nd (Lowland) Division's 156th (Scottish Rifles) Brigade, commanded by Brigadier General Archibald Herbert Leggett was the only brigade of that division able to advance. While the 156th Brigade advanced northwards along the coast, the division's 155th and 157th Brigades were regrouping after the fierce fighting at Sausage Ridge the previous day. The brigade sent two infantry patrols in support of a squadron of the XXI Corps Cavalry, to reconnoitre Ashkelon but this squadron could not move, as the men and horses had been without water for 36 hours. The 156th Brigade's patrols found Ashkelon deserted by the Ottoman army. They continued on to Al Majdel, a large village 16 miles (26 km) north of Gaza where they met units of the Anzac Mounted Division. Here substantial stores and a water supply were found. The towns of Beit Jerja, Burbera and Huleikat were all reported clear of Ottoman units.
