= Battle of Tel el Khuweilfe =

WWI battle in the Middle East

- Part of the Middle Eastern theatre of World War I
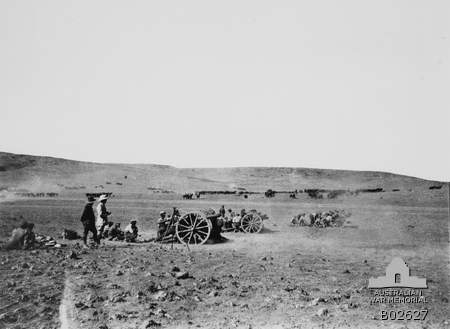
- Guns of the Inverness Royal Horse Artillery in action against Tel el Khuweilfe on 2 November
Date	1–6 November 1917 (5 days)
Location	North of Beersheba in the Judean Hills of southern Palestine
Result	British Empire victory

Belligerents
British Empire: Australia; New Zealand; United Kingdom	Ottoman Empire German Empire

Commanders and leaders
(United Kingdom of Great Britain and Ireland) Edmund Allenby (Australia) Harry Chauvel	(German Empire) Erich von Falkenhayn (Ottoman Empire) Fevzi Pasha

Units involved
53rd (Welsh) Division; Anzac Mounted Division; 5th Mounted Brigade (Australian Mounted Division); Yeomanry Mounted Division	III Corps headquarters 6th and 8th Regiments (3rd Cavalry Division); 19th Division; 27th Division (also known as the Beersheba Group); 2nd Regiment; 125th Regiment (16th Division); 143rd Infantry Regiment (24th Division); 24th Division headquarters 12th Depot Regiment

The Battle of Tel el Khuweilfe, part of the Southern Palestine Offensive, began on 1 November 1917, the day after the Egyptian Expeditionary Force (EEF) victory at the Battle of Beersheba during the Sinai and Palestine Campaign of World War I. After the Stalemate in Southern Palestine a series of coordinated attacks were launched by British Empire units on the Ottoman Empire's German commanded Yildirim Army Group's front line, which stretched from Gaza inland to Beersheba. During the fight for the town, the road from Beersheba to Jerusalem via Hebron, was cut just north of the town in the southern spur of the Judean Hills. Here Ottoman units strongly defended the road and the Seventh Army headquarters at Hebron.

Over the next week, attacks by the 53rd (Welsh) Division, the Anzac Mounted Division, and the 5th Mounted Brigade (Australian Mounted Division) attempted to capture the Tell el-Khuweilifeh position. Attacks were launched by the British infantry and Yeomanry cavalry, and Australian and New Zealand mounted brigades.

Despite their failure to dislodge the Ottoman defenders, the continuing pressure drew in Ottoman reserves, which could have made the EEF attacks at Gaza during the night of 1/2 November, and at Hareira and Sheria on 6–7 November, more strongly contested. On 6 November, in coordination with the attacks on Hareira and Sheria, the 53rd (Welsh) Infantry Division, with the Imperial Camel Brigade covering their flanks, made another inconclusive assault with artillery support. This fight continued the following day, until the Ottoman defenders began to withdraw, as a consequence of the loss of Hareira, the evacuation of Gaza, and the weakening of the Sheria position, all of which threatened to outflank the Tell el-Khuweilfeh position.

== Background ==
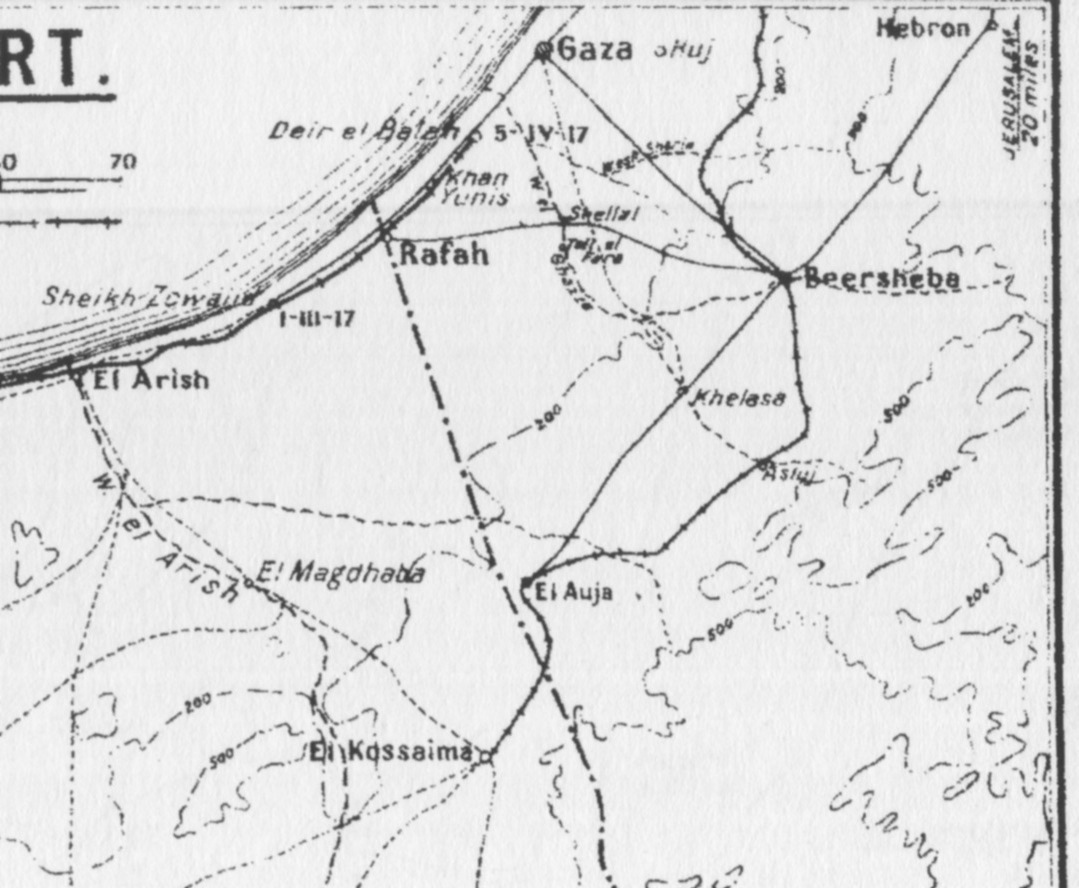
Gaza to Beersheba line on the edge of the Eastern Desert in southern Palestine

After the two EEF defeats at Gaza in March and April, the defences held at the end of the Second Battle of Gaza were fortified, while the severely depleted infantry divisions were reorganised and reinforced. Both sides constructed extensive entrenchments, which were particularly strong where the trenches almost converged, near Gaza. These trenches resembled those on the Western Front, except they were not as extensive and they had an open eastern flank.However, the conditions on the northern edge of the Negev desert were extremely difficult, with both sides camped in the open during the summer. Although the EEF railway, which had reached Deir al-Balah before the second battle of Gaza, was extended by a branch line to Shellal to aid the supply of the front line,serious food shortages and the prevalence of sandfly fever (a debilitating illness) were made almost intolerable by the regular hot desert winds known as khamsin, which swept off the Negev Desert. (Note: The Fifty-second (Lowland) Division by Lieutenant Colonel R. R. Thompson gives a good description of the summer conditions.)

Just prior to the arrival of General Edmund Allenby in July, Desert Column was expanded and reorganised into three divisions, with the establishment of the new Yeomanry Mounted Division. Allenby reorganised the EEF to reflect contemporary thinking, deactivating Eastern Force to establish two infantry and one mounted corps, all under his direct command: the XX Corps, the XXI Corps and the Desert Mounted Corps.

The Ottoman forces in the area were also reorganised into the Yildirim Army Group in June, commanded by German General and Ottoman Marshall Erich von Falkenhayn,and reinforced by surplus Ottoman units transferred from Galicia, Macedonia, Romania, and Thrace. Within Yildirim Army Group, while the Fourth Army headquarters and units in Syria commanded by Cemal Pasa, continued to operate as previously, the Fourth Army in Palestine was renamed and reorganised into the Seventh Army commanded by Fevzi Çakmak after the resignation of Mustafa Kemal and the Eighth Army, commanded by German General Kress von Kressenstein with responsibility for the Palestine front. Although these were significant organisational changes, they did not change the tactical deployments of the Ottoman III, XX and XXII Corps, defending the Gaza to Beersheba line.

== Prelude ==
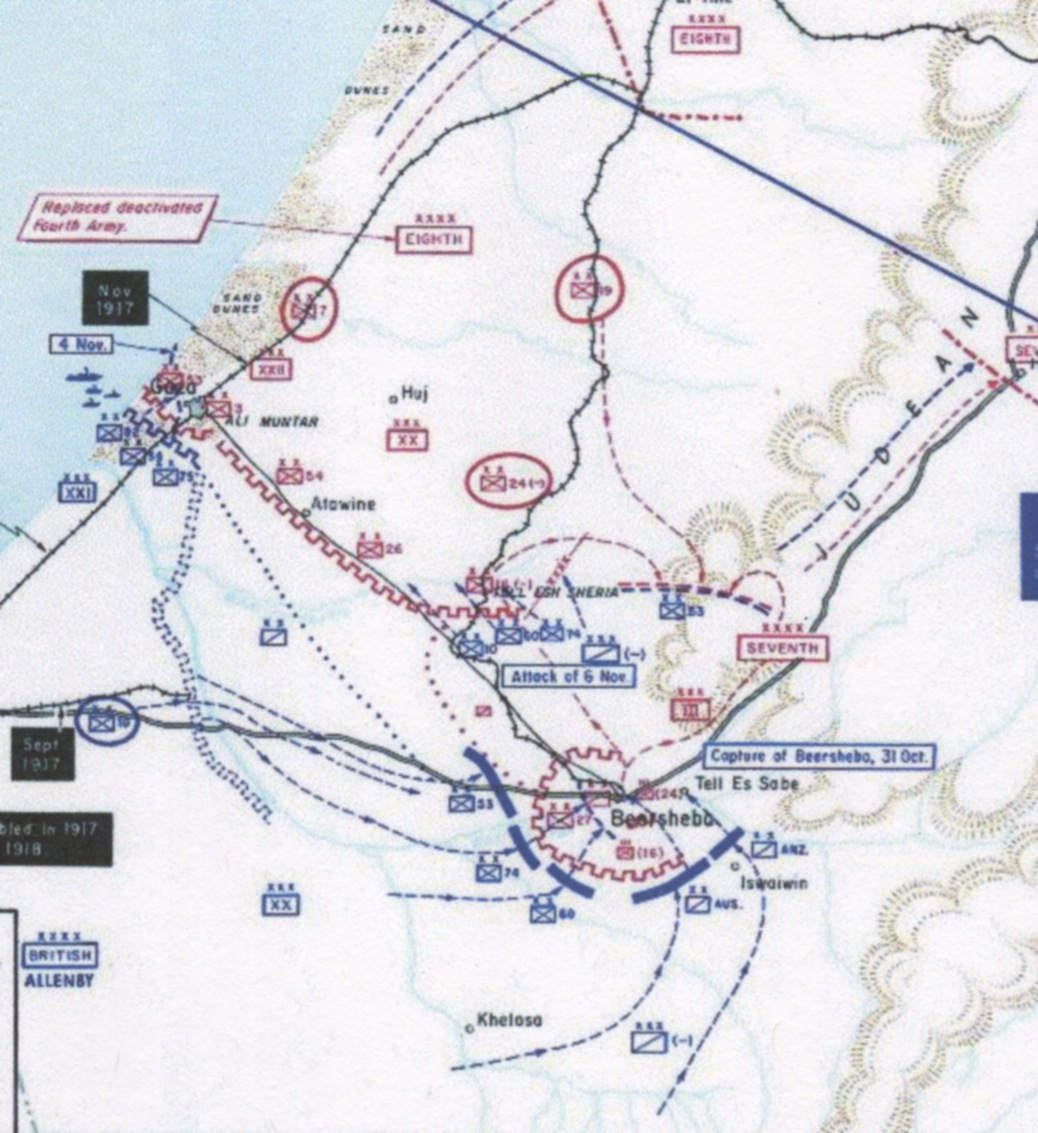
Positions on the Gaza-Beersheba line after the capture of Beersheba

The loss of Beersheba on 31 October stunned the Yildirim Army Group commander and staff.The Beersheba garrison withdrew to the Ottoman defences around Tel es Sheria and northwards to Tel el Khuweilfe, 10 miles (16 km) to the north of Beersheba, and about the same distance east of Sheria, to hold a line stretching from 5 miles (8.0 km) west of the road from Beersheba to Jerusalem. All available reserve units would soon be deployed in the Kuweilfeh area.Here, the Ottoman defenders were able to establish new defences, and the 19th Division was sent from the XXII Corps defending Gaza to reinforce them. (Note: This new defensive line was at Ebuhof.)

Although the Ottoman forces had been driven out of Beersheba, they had not been dislodged from the rest of the Ottoman defensive line stretching westward to the Mediterranean coast, which had been destabilised and "thrown back on its left, but not broken".The remainder of their line continued to be strongly defended, particularly at Hareira, Sharia and Gaza, but the loss of Beersheba had placed EEF mounted units across the Beersheba to Hebron and Jerusalem road, and three Eighth Army infantry battalions were sent by Kress von Kressenstein to reinforce the Ottoman troops fighting at Khuweilfe. They were to protect the only metalled road heading north in the region, which ran direct to Hebron and Jerusalem only about 50 miles (80 km) to the north, from the threat of an EEF mounted advance.

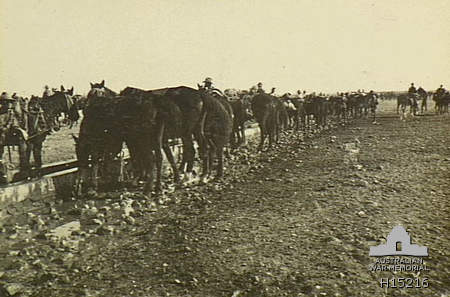
12th Light Horse Regiment watering horses at Beersheba

The area between Beersheba and the wells and cisterns at Bir Khuweilfe, where the rocky hills rise to become part of the Judean Hills, has been described as a "stone desert"of "waterless, rocky ridges and ravines", where small patches of cultivation are interspersed between "jagged outcrops" of loose stones and boulders. Scarce water was mainly found in little gullies, while the road to Jerusalem via Edh Dhahariye, Hebron and Bethlehem, ran along a series of ridges.

The strategically important height of Tel el Khuweifle not only dominated all the surrounding country, but was also the site of the best water supply in the area. However, the EEF had discovered important but scarce water supplies during the day of battle on 31 October. Water was found east of Beersheba by the New Zealand Mounted Rifles Brigade, in the Wadi el Malah, while the 2nd Light Horse Brigade found sufficient water for three brigades in a small wadi north of Bir Hammam, and a good supply in the Wadi Hora. The Auckland Mounted Rifle Regiment also found enough water for a whole brigade in the Bir Salim Abu Irgeig wadi.

=== Defenders ===
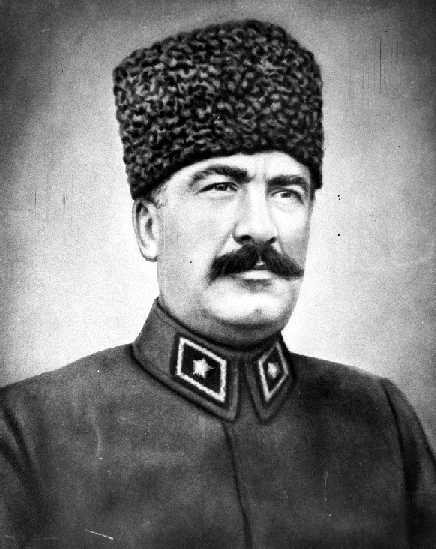
Commander of the Ottoman Seventh Army, Fevzi Pasa (also known as Mareşal Fevzi Çakmak) in October, 1923

Four Ottoman divisions fought in the area: the 19th, 24th and 27th Divisions, and the 3rd Cavalry Division.During the battle on 31 October, the Ottoman III Corps headquarters had retreated from Beersheba to Tel es Sheria but, the next day (1 November), moved to support the defence of the Jerusalem road from Edh Dhahriye. They were followed by the 143rd Regiment (24th Division) and 1,500 rifles of the Beersheba Group, which had been reorganised at Tel es Sheria. This latter group moved to defend Tel el Khuweilfe. On 1 November, the 125th Regiment (16th Division) also moved west into the hills coming under the command of the 27th Division, while the 6th Cavalry Regiment covered the Ottoman left flank to Yutta.Kress von Kressenstein also sent the 19th Division to reinforce the Seventh Army in the area. This strong Ottoman presence defending the area was designed to encourage Allenby to commit more units to the attack, to take the pressure off the Ottoman forces defending Gaza and Sharia, and to lessen the possibility of an EEF breakthrough. (Note: Colonel Husni claims 2,000 rifles in two regiments supported by two batteries of eight guns, defended the 22 to 23 kilometres (14 to 14 mi) long Ottoman front line, covering the Beersheba to Jerusalem road, acknowledging Tell el Sheria, "was the key to our front".)

=== Attackers ===
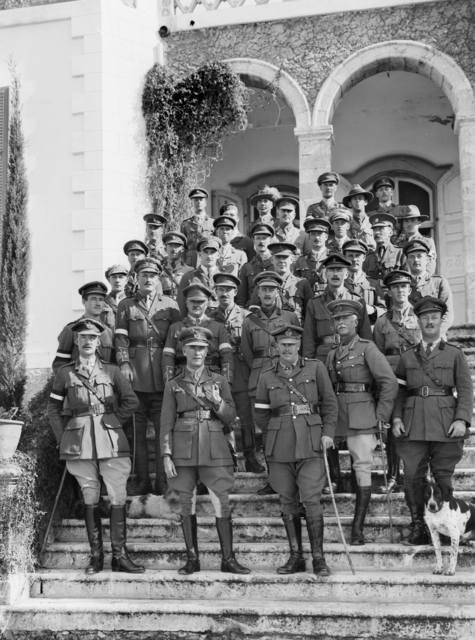
Lieutenant General Chauvel with his Desert Mounted Corps headquarters staff

Lieutenant General Harry Chauvel's Desert Mounted Corps deployed the attached 53rd (Welsh) Division, and the Imperial Camel Corps Brigade, along with the Anzac Mounted and Yeomanry Mounted Divisions, to threaten the Ottoman forces defending the road to Jerusalem. (Note: Logistical problems made an attack on Jerusalem impossible at the time.) Their advance pushed back the Ottoman forces into the Judean Hills to the north of Beersheba, creating sufficient space for the XX Corps to get into position for a flank attack on the centre at Hareira and Sheria. (Note: Falls claims, some confusion was caused by inaccurate maps and the EEF units being commanded by two separate corps.) This advance was also designed to isolate the Eighth Army forces on the maritime plain, supplied by the roads and railways from Ramla, from those of the Seventh Army, supplied by the motor road from Jerusalem in the hills.

=== Newcombe's detachment ===
Situation at 18:00 31 October 1917 including position of Newcombe's detachment

The southern end of the Beersheba to Jerusalem road, which was defended by the Ottoman 6th and 8th Regiments (3rd Cavalry Division) in the high ground of the foothills of the Judean Hills northeast of the town,was cut by the 2nd Light Horse Brigade's 5th and 7th Light Horse Regiments. These light horsemen continued to hold the section of the road just north of Beersheba during 31 October, when they were targeted by Ottoman machine guns from the high ground north of Sakaty.

In order to further disrupt Ottoman reinforcements travelling south along the Jerusalem to Beersheba road during the battle, a camel detachment of Hejaz Arabs with EEF machine guns, was to attack and cut the road well to the north of Beersheba. Lieutenant Colonel S. F. Newcombe (Royal Engineers) and his detachment of 70 British camelry and Arab scouts, armed with 10 machine guns, some Lewis Guns, and explosives, left Asluj with three days' rations on 30 October to circle around to the east, arriving 20 miles (32 km) to the northeast of Beersheba. During the battle on 31 October, this raiding force cut the road and telegraph between Hebron, the site of the Seventh Army headquarters and Jerusalem.

However, they were unable to attract reinforcements from local Arab soldiers, although the locals did provide guides. Therefore, when 100 Ottoman soldiers attacked Newcombe's detachment, they were scattered, suffering "considerable loss". By the time they were attacked a second time on the morning of 2 November, the detachment had blocked all Ottoman communications between Hebron and Edh Dhahriye for 40 hours. They were attacked by two companies of the Ottoman 143rd Regiment advancing northwards from Edh Dhahriye, as well as 100 German soldiers moving south from Hebron and Bethlehem, which forced the remnants of the detachment to surrender, suffering 20 killed. An Ottoman communiqué described the capture on the left of their line of 100 cavalry, including a lieutenant colonel.

== Battle ==
Fighting for Beersheba and the Beersheba to Jerusalem road on 31 October

Despite continuing fierce fighting for control of the high country around Khuweilfe being unresolved, Chauvel, commanding the EEF units in the area including the 53rd (Welsh) Division, had advanced to gain a "position of vantage from which to roll up the enemy's flank". Allenby had hoped that, if the hostile Ottoman forces could be held by the EEF units assigned the task, they could be "immobilised at the critical moment", and unable to reinforce the garrisons at Hareira and Sheria during the planned attack.The Khuweilfe fighting had drawn in all the local reserves including the 19th Division, the 3rd Cavalry Division, the remains of the 27th Division, which had formed the Beersheba garrison, and part of the 16th Division, which fought determinedly for Ain Kohleh, Tel Khuweilfeh and the road to Hebron and Jerusalem. None of these units left the area to reinforce the defences in front of Sheria.

Chauvel continued the attacks against these greatly superior Ottoman forces, despite heavy casualties that could not hope to be replaced due to the strategic priority of the proposed Hareira and Sheria attacks. His force also experienced supply difficulties. The horses deployed in the area had only a small ration of "pure grain", as no grazing was available, and water was barely sufficient in Beersheba for the troops actually in the town.Despite these difficulties, hard fighting failed to push Chauvel's force back to Beersheba.

=== 1 November ===
Detail shows positions of the line established by the 53rd (Welsh) Division and the New Zealand Mounted Rifle Brigade on 1 November

When 53rd (Welsh) Division, with the Imperial Camel Brigade attached, marched through Beersheba at 06:30 to take up a position 3–5 miles (4.8–8.0 km) to the west of the town, the only units defending the road to Jerusalem north of the town were the 3rd Cavalry Division and the 12th Depot Regiment, although the 125th and 143rd Regiments were on their way, followed by the 19th Division. By 15:00, they had established a line stretching from Khurbet el Muweileh in the west to the 1,558 feet (475m)-high Tuweiyil Abu Jerwal overlooking Beersheba, unopposed. From here, the division, with one battalion of the Imperial Camel Brigade on their right, could cover the right flank of the proposed advance by the XX Corps towards Hareira and Sheria. (Note: Grainger claims this advance took place on 3 November.)

However, when the Anzac Mounted Division advanced at about the same time to the east of the infantry position, to extend the line from Towal Abu Jerwal to the Beersheba-Jerusalem road (near Bir el Makruneh), they met strong opposition. Between 07:00 and 08:30, the Canterbury and Wellington Mounted Rifle Regiments (New Zealand Mounted Rifle Brigade) supported by two machine guns each, advanced to capture the Khirbet el Ras to Rijm Abu Jerwan line. A further advance was stopped by 400 Ottoman cavalry with six machine guns, deployed in high ground northwest of Khirbet el Ras. By 14:00, the two New Zealand regiments had made a further advance, when 13 prisoners and one machine gun were captured. After dark, they were relieved by the 1st Light Horse Brigade, at 23:30, having suffered two other ranks wounded. On their right, the 5th Light Horse Regiment (2nd Light Horse Brigade) advanced along the road to Jerusalem, 3 miles (4.8 km) north of Bir es Sakaty, to reconnoitre a line from Bir Makruneh to Deir Saideh. They were opposed by an Ottoman force armed with mountain guns and machine guns. During "brisk fighting", the light horsemen captured 179 prisoners and four machine guns.

While one battalion of the Imperial Camel Brigade covered the right of the 53rd (Welsh) Division, the remaining battalions were attached during the night to the Anzac Mounted Division, and deployed to the east and northeast of Beersheba. On the western side of the town, the line was held by the 60th (2/2nd London), the 74th (Yeomanry), and the 10th (Irish) Divisions, with the latter occupying the railway line to Abu Irgeig. From there, the line stretched back to the Wadi Ghazzeh, and the continuing artillery bombardment of Gaza. The Australian Mounted Division in corps reserve was deployed south east of Beersheba with the 4th Light Horse Brigade, clearing the battlefield.

=== 2 November ===
==== Desert Mounted Corps attacks ====
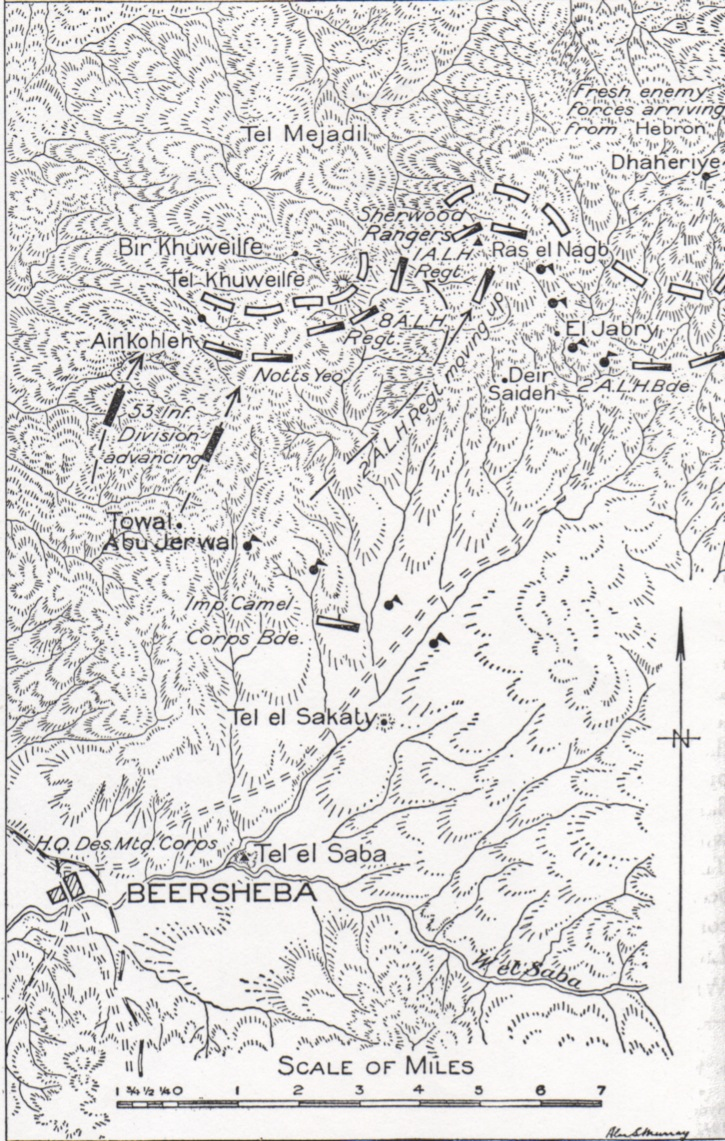
Tel el Khuweilfe attacks on 2 and 3 November. The sealed road to Jerusalem from Beersheba via Dharahiye is indicated as a track

Chauvel ordered the Anzac Mounted Division's 2nd Light Horse Brigade, with the temporarily attached 7th Mounted Brigade (consisting of the 1/1st Sherwood Rangers, the 1/1st South Notts Hussars, and the 8th Light Horse Regiment from the 3rd Light Horse Brigade, Australian Mounted Division), the 1st Light Car Patrol and the 11th Light Armoured Motor Battery, to capture Tel el Khuweilfe, Bir Khuwilfe, Bir Abu Khuff, Ain Khole and Dhahriye 15 miles (24 km) northeast of Beersheba. (Note: Grainger claims the 7th Mounted Division moved out towards Tel el Khuweilfe on 3 November.)

They deployed across the Beersheba to Jerusalem road and, as they advanced northwards during the day, encountered increasingly strong resistance. On the left, the 7th Mounted Brigade advanced up the Khuweilfe track, to 1 mile (1.6 km) northwest of Khirbet el Ras, which had been captured the previous day by the New Zealanders. The South Notts Hussars advanced on the right, with the Sherwood Rangers on the left, supported by the Essex Battery. At 14:00, "B" Squadron 8th Light Horse Regiment was ordered to attack Tel el Khuweilfe, but was held up and strongly opposed by the entrenched defenders, until the remainder of the regiment with two machine guns advanced to reinforce the squadron's attack.

By 15:00, the South Notts Hussars had pushed back small groups of Ottoman defenders off Ras en Naqb, some 12 miles north of Beersheba, capturing 11 prisoners and two guns. However, strong opposition to the attacks on Tel el Khuweilfe by the 8th Light Horse Regiment and on Khirbet Abu Khuff by the Sherwood Rangers prevented their capture, and the isolated South Notts Hussars were forced to retreat at nightfall back from Ras en Naqb. However, after the 8th Light Horse Regiment took up a line, they continued their attack through the night.

On the right of the 7th Mounted Brigade, the 2nd Light Horse Brigade had launched attacks towards Deir Saide and Edh Dhahriye, with the 6th Light Horse Regiment in front, the 7th Light Horse Regiment moving up the Beersheba to Jerusalem road, and the 5th Light Horse Regiment on their right. However, they were delayed by the steep rocky country, so their outflanking movement was not complete until after dark. During the night, the Anzac Mounted Division occupied a line stretching from about Bir el Nettar to Deir el Hawa, to Khurbet el Likiye, which connected with the Imperial Camel Brigade on the right of the 53rd (Welsh) Division, still near Toweil Abu Jerwal.

==== Ottoman defenders ====
Situation at 18:00 1 November 1917

The left flank of the Yildirim Army Group had been alarmed when communications between the Ottoman Seventh Army headquarters at Hebron and troops at Khirbet Abu Khuff on the western side of Khuweilfe were cut as a consequence of the capture of Ras en Naqb. (Note: Ras en Naqb was only briefly held and there is no mention of cutting communications at that time. However, there is mention of Newcombe's detachment cutting communications between Hebron and Jerusalem on 31 October.) They reinforced Tel el Khuweilfe to create a strong position, and the headquarters of the Ottoman III Corps was moved to Edh Dhahriye on the road from Beersheba to Hebron and Jerusalem. A defensive line protecting Edh Dhahriye was established, stretching from east to west across the road, which was held by part of the 2nd Regiment supported by 600 soldiers of the 12th Depot Regiment, and the 143rd Regiment strengthened by nine guns. They were commanded by the 24th Divisional headquarters, which had moved east from Tel esh Sheria. In the hills further to the west of the road and adjacent to the 2nd Regiment were the 8th Cavalry Regiment. The remnants of the Beersheba Group consisted of the 27th Division (1,350 soldiers), which included the 48th Regiment with seven guns and 27 machine guns, defending Tel el Khuweilfe. Meanwhile, the Ottoman 6th Cavalry Regiment's 4,000 rifles and sabres, moved eastwards to Yutta 4 miles (6.4 km) east of the Beersheba to Jerusalem road to the north of Edh Dhahriye, to guard against the possibility of EEF units repeating Newcombe's attack. Only the 16th Division remained in their original defensive position, to the south of Tel esh Sheria.

==== Defensive line ====
Reports of Ottoman reinforcements moving eastwards were received, and the 53rd (Welsh) Division spent the day digging trenches and defences. Their 160th Brigade on the left was relieved by the 229th Brigade of the 74th Division during the evening. A khamsin began to blow, which seriously depleting water supplies and threatened the efficiency of the EEF. Water transported to Beersheba from railhead on lorries for the Desert Mounted Corps, was handed over to the XX Corps, whose animals received 5 imperial gallons (23 L) each.

One infantry officer described the conditions:

Hard days these. Very little water, never enough for a wash; bully beef and biscuits unvaried, no mails, officers; kits only 30 pounds and often miles behind, dust and heat. We wore tin hats, and the intense heat of the sun on them made our heads feel like poached eggs.

Meanwhile, the New Zealand Mounted Rifles Brigade was ordered to take up a position covering the wells at Bir Imshash 12 miles (19 km) east of Beersheba, linking westwards with the right of the 2nd Light Horse Brigade on the Wadi Hora. Leaving bivouac at Tel el Saba, the New Zealanders arrived an hour and a half later to take up an outpost line. They remained holding this line, until 4 November.

=== 3 November ===
Situation at 18:00 3 November 1917

==== Ottoman counterattack ====
Falkenhayn ordered a counterattack to be carried out on the morning of 3 November in a southeasterly direction to push the EEF off the Beersheba to Jerusalem road, and stop the threatened outflanking of the Ottoman left. Ali Fuad commanding the Ottoman XX Corps assembled the 16th Division and the 3rd Cavalry Division along with part of the 19th Division, which arrived after a four-day march from Tel esh Sheria. However, the late arrival of the 19th Division, which did not begin to arrive until the afternoon, and Chauvel's advance, prevented this Ottoman attack from being launched. (Note: Bruce adds the Ottoman 24th and 27th Divisions to this attacking force.)

==== Tel el Khuweilfe and Ras en Naqb ====
EEF aerial reconnaissance had observed the Ottoman columns' movements, and Chauvel ordered the 53rd (Welsh) Division to advance to the track from Ain Kohle to Tel es Sheria in the direction of Khuweilfe, to connect with Desert Mounted Corps units holding the outpost line. (Note: Falls says Chetwode issued the orders but this infantry division was attached to the Desert Mounted Corps and therefore under Chauvel's orders.)At dawn, it was apparent the Ottoman defenders on Tel el Khuweilfe had been reinforced and, on the right, Major General Edward Chaytor, commanding the Anzac Mounted Division, ordered the 1st Light Horse Brigade, supported by the Inverness Battery, forward to support the 7th Mounted Brigade while the 53rd (Welsh) Division advanced on their left, to establish a line stretching from Ras en Naqb towards Tel el Khuweilfe 2.5 miles (4.0 km) away. By 04:15, the two brigade headquarters had joined up and, by 07:00, the South Notts Hussars regiment of the 7th Mounted Brigade had occupied Ras el Nagb, while the 1st Light Horse Regiment with two sub-sections of Machine Gun Squadron attacked on their left, to gain a horseshoe-shaped position. Two squadrons with eight Hotchkiss Rifles and four machine guns stopped attempted outflanking movements. By 08:00, they were within 350 yards (320 m) of their objective on the left, but could make no further advance in that sector.

The leading squadron of the 2nd Light Horse Regiment (1st Light Horse Brigade) reached Ras en Naqb soon after 10:00 but, owing to the strength of the Ottoman counterattacks, the Hussars remained until late in the afternoon, when another attack was held with additional support from a squadron of the 3rd Light Horse Regiment (1st Light Horse Brigade). Two squadrons of the 3rd Light Horse Regiment were sent to reinforce Ras el Nagb at 10:50 when a large movement of enemy was "easily repulsed".

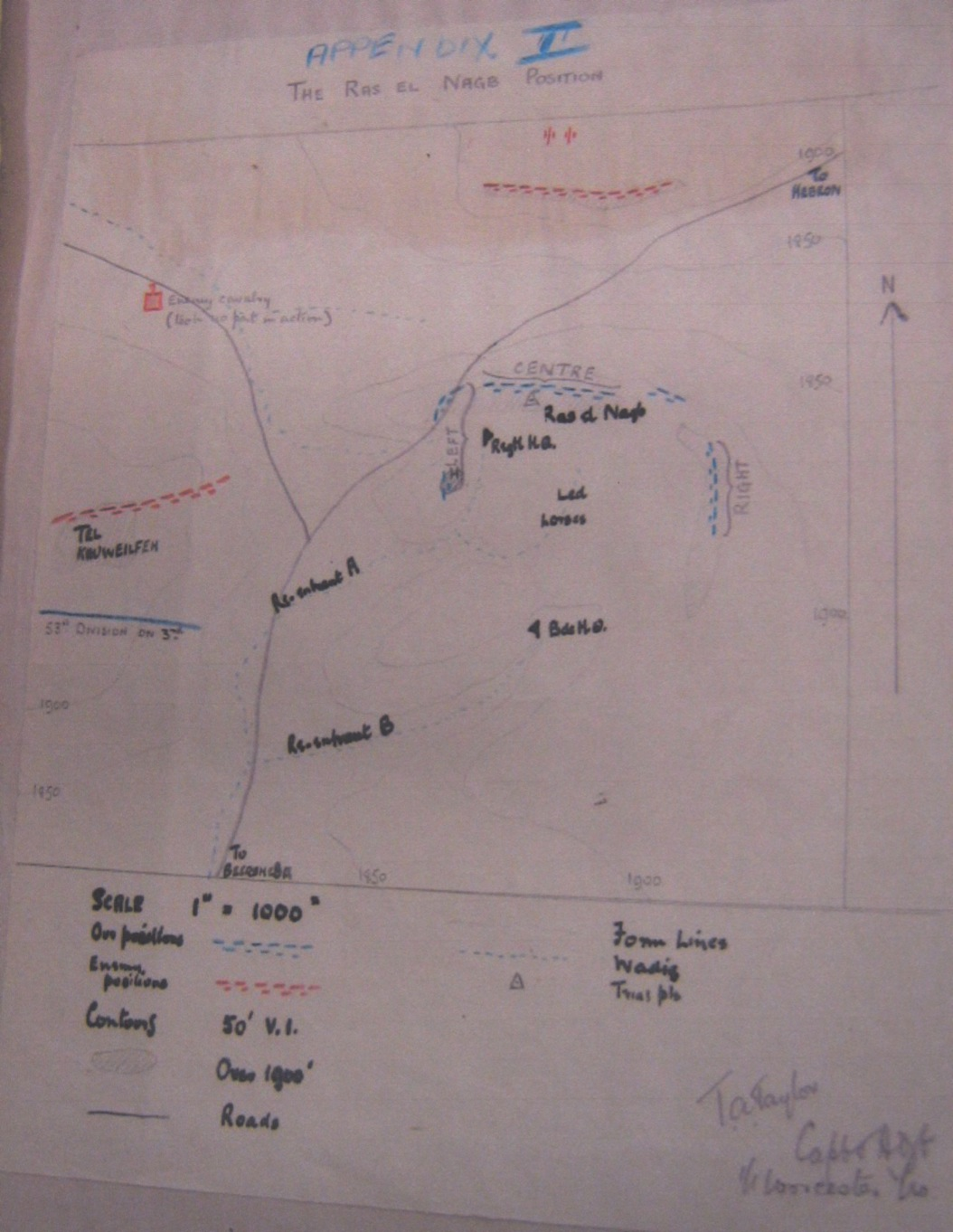
Worcestershire Yeomanry's sketch map of the Ras en Naqb position

At 12:30, the 5th Mounted Brigade moved to Ras el Nagb on the eastern spur of the Khuweilfe position, to relieve the two squadrons of the 1st Light Horse Brigade with two squadrons holding the Nagb post itself, and two troops on the western slopes. This relief was complete by 16:00, when the two squadrons join the 2nd Light Horse Regiment at 17:15 due south of Tel el Khuweilfe. In the meantime, the 2nd Light Horse Regiment had been reinforced by two sub-sections of Machine Gun Squadron at 12:45. By 18:00, the 5th Mounted Brigade Yeomanry had suffered 12 wounded including two second lieutenants and about 15 horses killed.

As the infantry came up at 14:15, a squadron of 3rd Light Horse Regiment with two subsections of Machine Gun Squadron took up a position on a stony ridge on their right, to the southwest of Tel el Khuweilfe, from where they caused a number of casualties and compelled three Ottoman machine guns on a ridge to move. From this stony ridge, accurate spotting for the 53rd (Welsh) Division howitzer battery resulted in "very effective artillery fire".

The 53rd (Welsh) Division was strongly resisted during their attack on Tel el Khuweilfe, although they managed to capture "a precarious footing on the southwestern spur of the hill", suffering heavy casualties in the process. Advancing in two columns, the 159th Brigade moved towards Khirbet Abu Khuff, fighting "several sharp little actions" against Ottoman detachments near Ain Kohle. The 160th Brigade on the right succeeded in advancing up a slight valley east of the Abu Jerwal peak and, by 12:30, they were within range of Tel el Khuweilfe, and extending the Anzac Mounted Division's firing line. (Note: The 158th Brigade, less the 5/Royal Welch Fusiliers escorting artillery, remained in divisional reserve.)

As units of the 53rd (Welsh) Division had passed through the positions held by the 4th Battalion Imperial Camel Brigade and 8th Light Horse Regiment, they were withdrawn at 14:30 to water. However, further advances by these infantry brigades were strongly resisted and no further progress was made before darkness halted fighting. They eventually established a line south of the Wadi Kohle, in close touch with the enemy, having suffering 400 casualties. However, a patrol by the 4/Sussex succeeded in working their way round the Ottoman position to within sight of wells in the rear during the evening before returning safely to their lines. It was decided that the infantry attack would not be pushed, and the 5th Mounted Brigade took over the line held by the 1st Light Horse Brigade after dark. During the fighting, the 1st Light Horse Brigade suffered 16 killed and 67 wounded.

==== Edh Dhahriye ====
On the right of the Ras en Naqb position, the 2nd Light Horse Brigade continued fighting towards Edh Dhahriye on the main road north from Beersheba to Hebron and Jerusalem. The brigade was deployed on a front of several miles, sending patrols round the Ottoman flank to within 1 mile (1.6 km) of the road, 2 miles (3.2 km) north of Edh Dhahriye, from where they could see the busy motor traffic heading towards Hebron and Jerusalem. However, a general advance, which began at 10:15, was unable to make any gains because the brigade was too thinly stretched over a wide area. This attack was not pressed, but a couple of days' supply of water was found.

===== Water, relief and evacuation problems =====
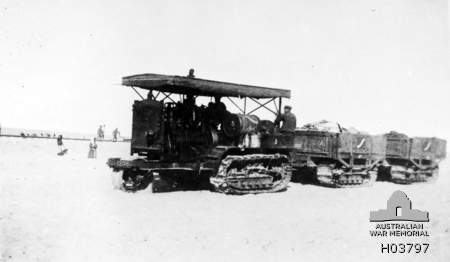
Caterpillar tractor towing two trailers across the desert

As there was no water in the Ras en Naqb area, it was necessary to return to water at the Beersheba wells, which had been augmented by thunderstorms two or three days before the town was captured. Although the wells in Beersheba had not been seriously damaged, the pumping engines could not be used and had to be replaced. New pumps were carried in by caterpillar tractors, while the pumping plant at Asluj was dismantled and brought in to Beersheba on 3 November. Several wells were found in gardens on 3 and 4 November, and although the water left after the thunderstorms and the wadies was soon exhausted, by 6 November 390,000 gallons a day were being produced, equaling demand.This was supplemented by 100 motor lorries carrying full 1,800 litres (480 US gal) water tanks that shuttled between Beersheba and Karm 26 kilometres (16 mi) away.

The divisional supply trains were withdrawn back to Karm, where water was readily available, because 30,000 animals in the Beersheba area needed water. Meanwhile, the horses of the 1st, 2nd Light Horse, 5th Mounted and New Zealand Mounted Rifle Brigades, fighting in the Tel el Khuweilfe area, had only one really good drink during the four days they were in the area, even though the 7th Mounted Brigade found enough water on the east of the line for their horses. The 8th Light Horse Regiment, having suffered three killed and 14 wounded on 3 November, retired with the 1st Light Horse Brigade back to Beersheba, where the regiment watered for the first time in 39 hours. The horses of the 1st Light Horse Brigade had, by then, been 30 hours without water.

In order for the horses to be watered, Chaytor ordered the 5th Mounted Brigade (temporarily attached to the Anzac Mounted Division from the Australian Mounted Division), to relieve the 1st Light Horse Brigade at Ras en Naqb.The Worcestershire Yeomanry (5th Mounted Brigade) had ridden to Abu Jerwan and on to near Ain Kohle, where all packhorses were left at 14:00 before the regiment rode quickly in column of half squadrons extended to 500 yards (460 m) internals between squadrons, under heavy shrapnel and machine gun fire. Although there was cover behind the hill, the departure and approach of large numbers of horses and troopers were targeted from an Ottoman position on the left as they rode up a valley to within 800 yards (730 m) of their attackers before heading to the right up another valley, to reach Ras en Naqb.

I shall never forget the sight as line after line of Yeomen swept up the valley at a steady canter under a hail of machine gun and rifle bullets. Whether it was our pace which put the Turkish marksmen off their aim or not I cannot say, but we managed to reach the comparative safety of the second valley with little loss.

— Major Lord Hampton, a squadron commander in the Worcestershire Yeomanry

The wounded had to be transported a few miles back from the front line to dressing stations by camels and sand carts. From there, they were taken back to collecting stations in the foothills of the Judean Hills, or along the Jerusalem to Beersheba road, from where they were evacuated to the Anzac and Australian Mounted Divisions receiving stations near Beersheba. Here, they were joined from 6 November, by the Yeomanry Mounted Divisional receiving station. From these divisional receiving stations, and the main infantry dressing stations, the wounded were sent back to Imara.

=== 4 November ===
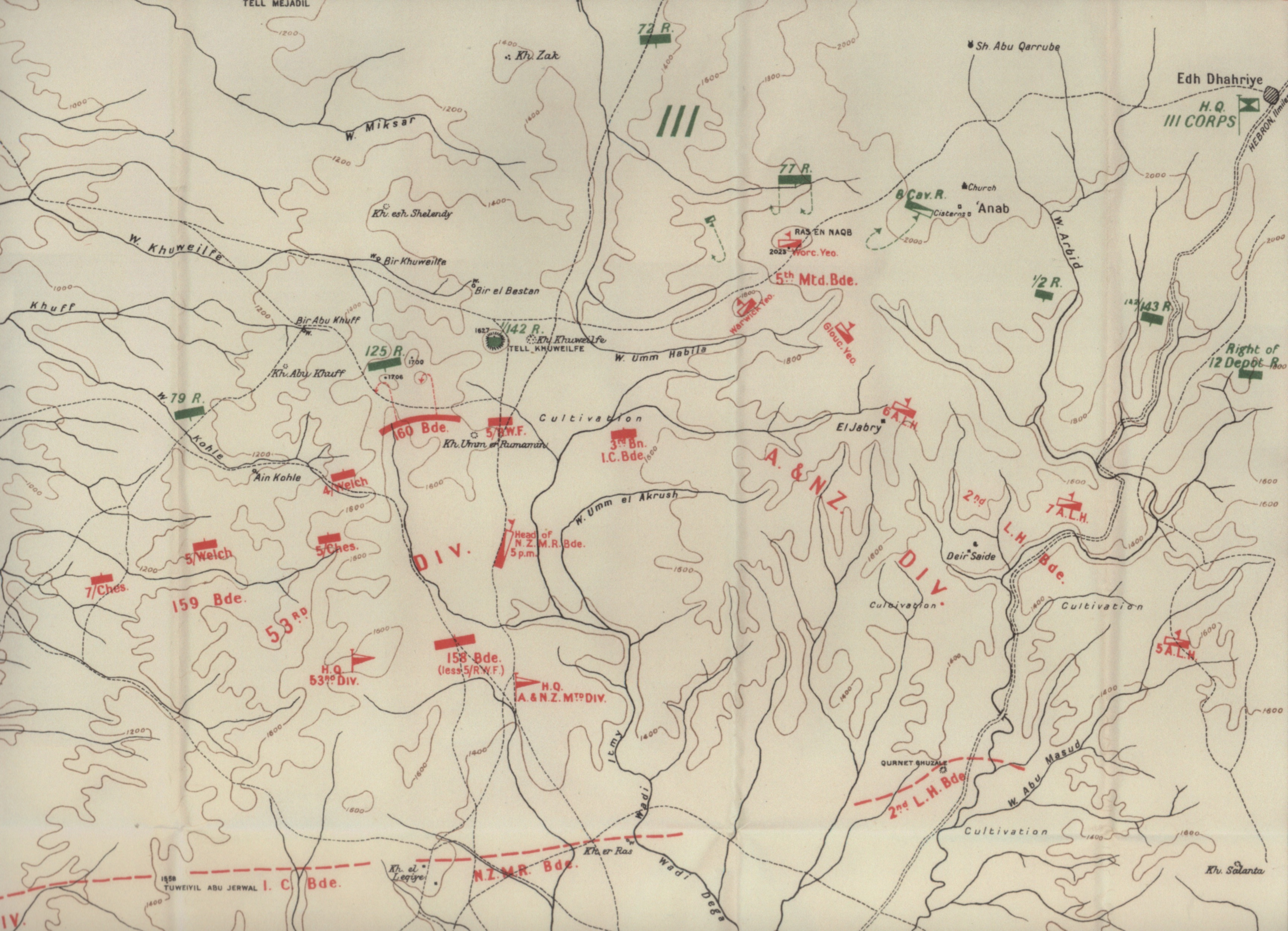
Operations north of Beersheba on 4 November, includes the line established on 1 November

The III Corps headquarters remained at Edh Dhahriye, while the Ottoman defenders held a line stretching eastward from the 48th Regiment to the 81st Regiment, and on to the 79th Regiment, all defending the Wadi Abu Khuff to Bir Abu Khuff. The 125th Regiment held the ground east of the Bir, with part of the 142nd Regiment on Tel el Khuweilfe, and the 72nd Regiment in reserve. The 77th Regiment was deployed behind Ras en Naqb with the 8th Cavalry Regiment on their left close to Anab, while part of the 2nd Regiment, part of the 143rd Regiment, and the 12th Depot Regiment stretched across the road to Jerusalem, defending Edh Dhahriye.

Early in the morning Falkenhayn, still on his journey south, ordered the recapture of Ras en Naqb by the 77th Regiment (19th Division) and the 8th Cavalry Regiment. A patrol to reconnoitre the high ground occupied by about half an Ottoman battalion, in the direction of the Beersheba to Jerusalem road by a troop of the Worcestershire Yeomanry (5th Mounted Brigade), came under heavy rifle fire at 06:00, forcing them to return to Ras en Naqb. The regiment was relieved half an hour later by the Gloucester Yeomanry, although the Worcestershire Yeomanry remained close by, saddled up in the wadi with the led horses. At 14:00, they returned to take over the line again from the Gloucester Yeomanry. By 15:00, intermittent Ottoman shelling was increasing in volume, when an additional Ottoman battery came into action on the right, and a strong counterattack developed. This attack from the north east was mainly against an advanced troop on the right centre, which was compelled to retire.

A strong attack by 1,500 Ottoman soldiers was subsequently launched from the north, which advanced steadily from a ridge, covered by intense machine gun and rifle fire. This attack compelled the left flank of the Worcestershire Yeomanry to retire about 100 yards (91 m). At about 16:00 a squadron of Ottoman cavalry rode into the valley between the ridge and Tel el Khuweilfe, held by the 3rd Battalion of the Imperial Camel Brigade, making the position of the Yeomanry, extremely critical. The Ottoman attack had advanced to within 200–300 yards (180–270 m) along the whole central sector of their line, when two squadrons of Gloucester Yeomanry came up in support, at the gallop. They dismounted rapidly to reinforce the left and centre sectors, while the Warwickshire Yeomanry and "D" Squadron Worcestershire Yeomanry, came up in support on the right, followed shortly afterwards by the remaining squadron of the Gloucester Yeomanry on the left, stabilising the situation.

By this time, the 5th Mounted Brigade had been 30 hours without water and were to be relieved by the New Zealand Mounted Rifles Brigade. Ordered to Rijm Abu Jerwan, the Canterbury Mounted Rifles Regiment took over a section of the line at 17:30, connecting with the 2nd Light Horse Brigade on the Beersheba to Jerusalem road on the right, and the 53rd (Welsh) Division attacking Tel Khuweilfe on the left. However, towards dusk, the 5th Mounted Brigade was again heavily attacked at Ras en Naqb, so it was not until 20:00 that one regiment of the New Zealand Mounted Rifle Brigade completed the relief of the Worcestershire Yeomanry.

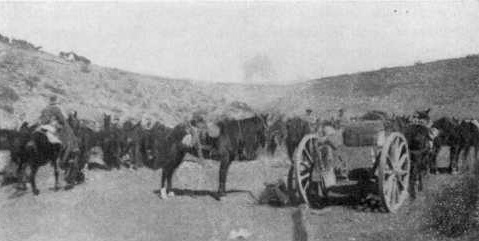
New Zealand Mounted Rifle Brigade first line transport and led horses in Shrapnel Gully during the fighting

Between 20:00 and 22:00, the Worcestershire Yeomanry collected their 11 wounded, carrying those who could not ride on blankets down the narrow ravine to the waiting sand carts. At 22:00, the regiment, followed by the Gloucester and Warwick Yeomanry, came under machine gun fire in the moonlight from the Ottoman defenders, holding Khuweilfe. It was only under very difficult circumstances that the wounded could be brought back from the firing line, when many helpers and wounded were killed. Many of these further casualties occurred when they had to pass through a shrapnel zone, as there were no regular communication trenches.The Worcestershire Yeomanry returned to Beersheba along the Jerusalem road, leaving lightly wounded who were riding at the Anzac Mounted Division receiving station near Keirdirat. The Worcestershire Yeomanry (5th Mounted Brigade) finally watered their horses at 04:00 on 5 November after the horses had been 45 hours without water. They remained at Beersheba until 7 November, when they marched to Sheria.

While the Worcestershire Yeomanry was collecting their wounded, the Gloucestershire Hussars had returned to reinforce the New Zealander's position, along with a squadron of Warwickshire Yeomanry. This combined force held an Ottoman attack, which in some places reached to within 100 yards (91 m) of the front line. The New Zealand Mounted Rifles Brigade subsequently advanced on both flanks at 23:00, when one squadron of the Auckland Mounted Rifles Regiment was sent to reinforce the right, while one squadron of the Wellington Mounted Rifle Regiment was sent to the left. The New Zealand Mounted Rifle Brigade suffered more than 50 casualties during this fighting. After a pause, the strong Ottoman cavalry attack continued, before they eventually began to retire back to their starting positions on the ridge.

During the next two days, the New Zealand Mounted Rifle Brigade at Ras el Nagb, continued to be involved in heavy fighting. Many counterattacks launched by the Ottoman forces were withstood by the 1st Light Horse, the 5th Mounted and the New Zealand Mounted Rifle Brigades, between 3 and 5 November. Meanwhile, fighting for Tel el Khuweilfe, continued day and night during 4 and 5 November, when Ottoman reserves strongly attacked the EEF units, but the results were inconclusive. Although the 53rd (Welsh) Division renewed their attacks on the Tel el Khuweilfe position, they were held up during the "least successful of all the confused fighting which took place in the hills". To add to the confusion, the EEF Intelligence Department had lost track of the whereabouts of an Ottoman division that had been sent to reinforce Beersheba on 31 October, and it ultimately ended up strengthening the defences at Tel el Kuweilfeh.

==== Beersheba conference ====
Major General S.F. Mott, commander of the 53rd (Welsh) Division, reported to Beersheba at 09:00 for a conference of divisional commanders. By 10:15, the conference was over and Chetwode telegraphed to Allenby, "General Chauvel and myself, after closest consultation, have decided with great reluctance that, owing to water difficulties and thirst of men, postponement till 6th November is inevitable." Allenby drove up from Khan Yunis to Beersheba, and after talking with Chauvel and Chetwode, agreed to the postponement. (Note: Grainger claims the conference was held on 5 November.) Mott believed Allenby agreed to the participation of the 53rd (Welsh) Division in the main attack on 6 November as flank guard, because "he wanted to avoid any possibility of the Turks retreating on the whole front before his general scheme was launched." (Note: Allenby's job as commander of the EEF was to capture Jerusalem.)

After the conference Chauvel, along with Major General Hodgson (commanding Australian Mounted Division) and Brigadier General Wilson (commanding 3rd Light Horse Brigade) visited the 8th Light Horse Regiment to personally thank the officers and men for their contribution to the Tel el Khuweilfe operation the day before. Due to the water shortages at Beersheba, the 8th Light Horse Regiment moved out with the reserve division, the Australian Mounted Division (less the 5th Mounted Brigade and one regiment of the 3rd Light Horse Brigade) at 13:20, to arrive at Karm near the Wadi Ghuzzee at 21:30. After watering, the regiment was in bivouac by 22:30.

=== 5 November ===
The New Zealand Mounted Rifle Brigade, holding the el Jabry to Ras en Naqb line to the east of Tel Khuweilfe, was opposed at the time by an estimated 300 infantry strongly supported by machine guns. During the day, a strong Ottoman attack was made on Ras el Naqb, which was stopped by the Canterbury Mounted Rifles Regiment. The attack began with an Ottoman artillery battery consisting of three guns, shelling the Canterbury Mounted Rifle Regiment's advanced lines at about 08:00. An hour later, the New Zealand Mounted Rifle Brigade was heavily enfiladed by another Ottoman artillery battery of seven guns from the direction of Tel el Khuweilfe. And at 10:00, a force of Ottoman soldiers, estimated to be 400 strong, attacked the Canterbury Mounted Rifles Regiment, which was quickly reinforced by two squadrons of the Wellington Mounted Rifle Regiment. Together, they stopped the Ottoman attackers, although shelling continued during the day from well-concealed positions, which the Somerset Battery was unable to locate. The brigade suffered 6 killed and 81 wounded, while 35 horses were killed and 84 wounded. Desert Mounted Corps headquarters reported back to EEF headquarters that the Ottoman force had attacked the New Zealand Mounted Rifles Brigade at Ras El Nagb with the bayonet, but were caught by machine gun fire and driven back, causing an estimated 300 casualties.

At 14:00, the New Zealand Mounted Rifles Brigade was told to prepare to be relieved by the Imperial Camel Brigade at 17:00. (Note: Preston claims there was no brigade available to relieve the New Zealanders.) However, the Imperial Camel Brigade got lost until dawn, so the New Zealand Mounted Rifles Brigade was forced to stay in the firing line. By 23:00, because the brigade's horses had not had a drink for 48 hours, they were sent back to Beersheba to water. They were finally relieved by the 4th Battalion Imperial Camel Brigade between 08:00 and 13:30 on 6 November, marching out on foot at 14:00 as their horses were still at Beersheba. During their service in the front line, the New Zealand Mounted Rifles Brigade suffered 87 casualties as well as 119 casualties to the horses.

Meanwhile, the convoys bringing food and water from Beersheba to the 53rd (Welsh) Division lost their way. The camel convoy carrying the water arrived at 04:30, by which time some of the mules from one battalion had been 53 hours without a drink. Although a motor lorry column brought some water forward, the infantrymen and their animals were on short supplies. While the artillery bombardment began at 05:00, the 160th Brigade was forced to begin their attack 15 minutes later on empty stomachs. Some progress was made on the lower slopes of Hill 1706. However, not long afterwards, supplies of artillery ammunition almost ran out, and the attack was terminated. Another attack planned for later in the day was postponed by Chetwode's direct order until 6 November, when a general attack was planned. The attacks towards Edh Dhahriye, on the road north to Hebron and Jerusalem by the 2nd Light Horse Brigade were able to proceed, as they had access to water and grazing in the area. During the day, a troop on patrol reached Es Semua 7 miles (11 km) east of Edh Dhahriye, while the 6th Light Horse Regiment continued to hold a difficult position while being subjected to machine gun and sniper fire, which caused casualties every day. However, strong Ottoman defensive positions in the rocky hill country made advances difficult, while artillery duels were a daily occurrence. When the brigade headquarters and the 5th Light Horse Regiment were targeted, causing a number of casualties, it was suspected that friendly Arabs had revealed the light horsemen's positions. The brigade continued to hold these advanced positions until they were relieved by the 2nd Battalion Imperial Camel Brigade, when they withdrew by moonlight to arrive at 06:30 at Tuweil el Mahdi, east of Bir es Sakaty, on 6 November. The right of the EEF line was now held by the 2nd Battalion Imperial Camel Brigade with their 4th Battalion at Ras en Naqb.

=== 6 November general attack ===
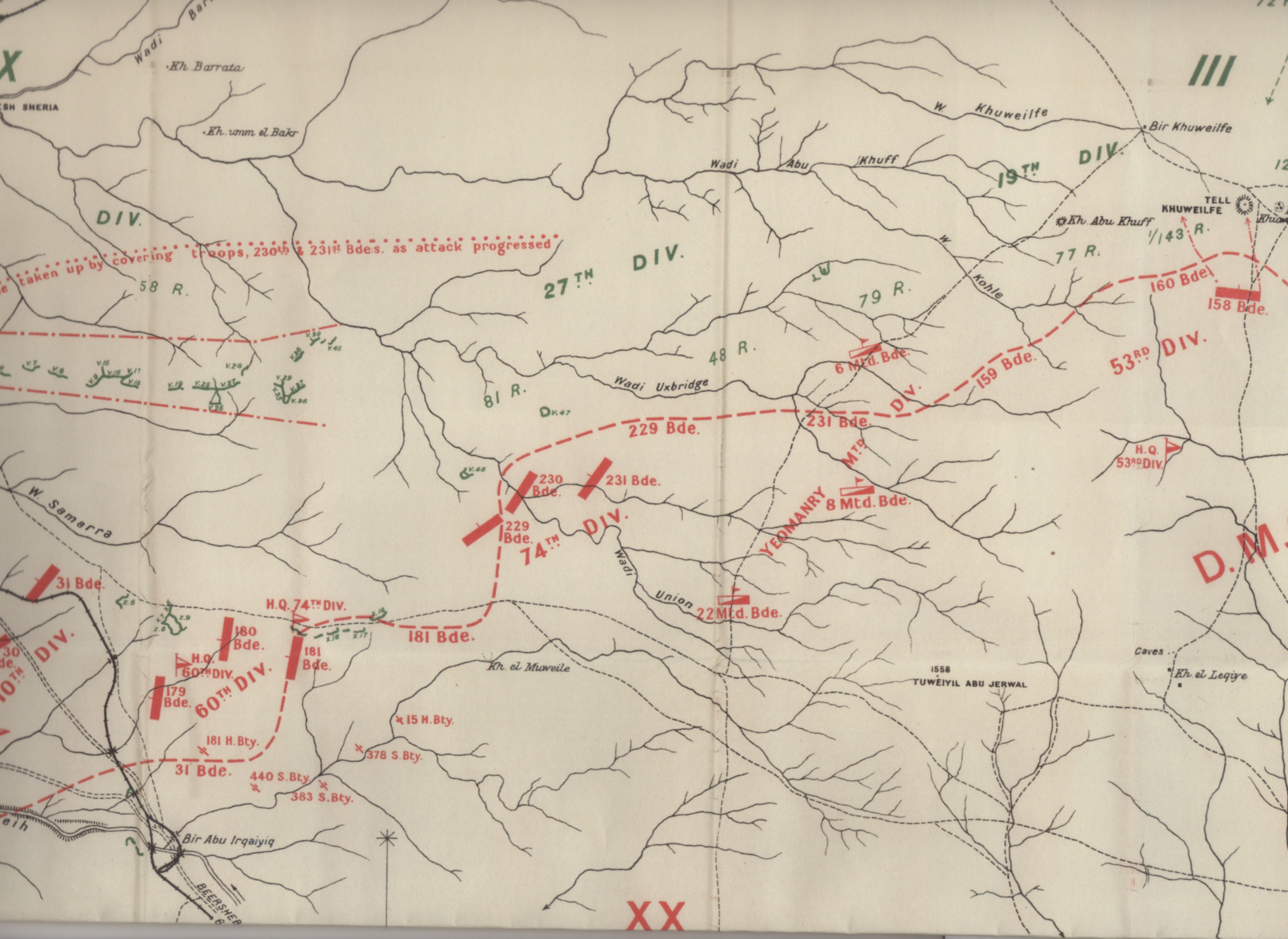
Positions of the XX Corps on 6 November from Tel el Khuweilfe westwards towards Hareira before the attack

Falkenhayn, commanding the Yildirim Army Group, finally arrived from Aleppo to establish his headquarters in the German Hospice on the Mount of Olives during the evening of 5 November. However, despite the delay of six days since the capture of Beersheba, "the attack [on the centre of the Ottoman front line] was now about to be carried out in the most favourable circumstances." This was largely because at least seven Ottoman infantry regiments, including the 19th Division, had been drawn into the defence of the road from Beersheba to Jerusalem, and the fighting for Ras en Naqb and Tel el Khuweilfe. Only two regiments were holding the 6.5 miles (10.5 km) Ottoman front line, which stretched along the Wadi esh Sheria to the west.

After the Anzac Mounted Division (less the New Zealand Mounted Rifles Brigade) moved off on 6 November to prepare for the breakthrough at Sheria with the Australian Mounted Divisions, the remaining force was briefly known as Barrow's Detachment while the Yeomanry Mounted Division and the New Zealanders remained in the area. Chauvel's attacking force was deployed early in the morning with the Yeomanry Mounted Division on the left, the 53rd (Welsh) Division in the centre south west of Tel el Khuweilfe, with the 4th Battalion Imperial Camel Brigade at Ras en Naqb and the 2nd Battalion holding the right. (Note: Falls notes the 53rd (Welsh) Division coming under orders of Desert Mounted Corps at 06:00 on 6 November.) On the left of the Yeomanry Mounted Division, the line was continued by the 74th (Yeomanry) Division and the 60th (London) Division, which were to attack Sheria.Allenby letter to Wigram 7 November 1917 intended for the King. The 10th (Irish) Division, which was to attack the Rushdi system of trenches and the Hareira redoubt, was on their left, continuing the line westwards.

The objective of the 53rd (Welsh) Division, during the main attack on the center of the Ottoman line at Hareria and Sheria, was to occupy the Khuweilfe to Rujm edh Dhib line to the north of the Wadi Khuweilfe and stretching 5 miles (8.0 km) west north west of Tel el Khuweilfe. Mott had argued at the conference on 4 November for an attack by the 53rd (Welsh) Division on the Khuweilfe position only, without "seeking to press forward on his left". They were to attack Tel el Khuweilfe and the three peaks forming a ridge to the southwest, defended by the Ottoman 125th Regiment, part of the 143rd Regiment, and the 77th Regiment of the 19th Division, which had fought in Galicia. The Ottoman 27th Division guarded the continuation of the Ottoman line westwards, with the 16th Division protecting Sheria and part of the 26th Division to the west of Hareira. Mott deployed four infantry battalions, the 158th Brigade with the 4/Royal Sussex of the 160th Brigade attached, to attack under cover of his divisional artillery (less one battery), the 91st Heavy Battery and the concentrated machine guns. Meanwhile, two infantry battalions formed the divisional reserve, and the attached 3rd Battalion Imperial Camel Brigade guarded the right flank.

The intense bombardment began at 04:00 and 20 minutes later, all 16 guns of the machine gun company were firing a barrage on the near face of the ridge. They lifted their fire as the infantry approached before continuing to fire on the reverse slope. The infantry attack began in darkness and the mist during the early morning disorganised the initial advance, some units being "scattered in the fierce and confused fighting". (Note: All reported quoted references to a faulty map made reconstruction of the fighting difficult.)

The 6th Battalion Royal Welch Fusiliers were a little late in starting, and the Hereford battalion on its left swung slightly left-handed attempting to establish touch. Instead of "straddling" Tel el Khuweilfe, the company on the right wheeled across the front of the Ottoman position, where they were heavily attacked by machine guns. In the centre, a company of the Hereford with the 6th Battalion Royal Welch Fusiliers, "carried their objectives with the bayonet", capturing nine field guns in the process. However, they found their flanks exposed, and were strongly counterattacked from three directions, and compelled to withdraw without the guns. During this retreat, they were fired on by their own guns, before being supported by a company of the 5th Battalion Royal Welch Fusiliers, in establishing a new line. Meanwhile, on the left, the 7th Battalion Royal Welch Fusiliers and the 4th Battalion Sussex captured Hill 1706 and the spur to the west in very close fighting. At daylight, the 3rd Battalion Imperial Camel Brigade, sheltering behind the northern flank of a little valley running west to east, were strongly attacked before joining a group of Hereford infantry in pushing the "enemy back along the spur". They were supported by the 2nd Australian Machine Gun Squadron, which galloped up the valley under heavy enemy machine gun fire, to reinforce the "hard–pressed" camel battalion.

The 53rd (Welsh) Division captured a footing on the main Khuweilfe Ridge, but they were heavily counterattacked and forced to make a partial retreat, before the Ottoman force was eventually dislodged from the ridge but not the Tel. (Note: Claims by Hill and Grainger, that the New Zealand Mounted Rifles Brigade took part in this fighting, are not sustained by the war diary.) At 14:00, EEF headquarters received a telephone message from Desert Mounted Corps to the effect that the 53rd (Welsh) Division "had been having rather a bad time", and that Chauvel had gone to see the commander. Shortly afterwards, it was reported that the Yeomanry Mounted Division's headquarters and four regiments were holding the Ain Kohle to Sheria track, and were in touch with the 53rd (Welsh) Division on their right and the 74th (Yeomanry) Division on their left.

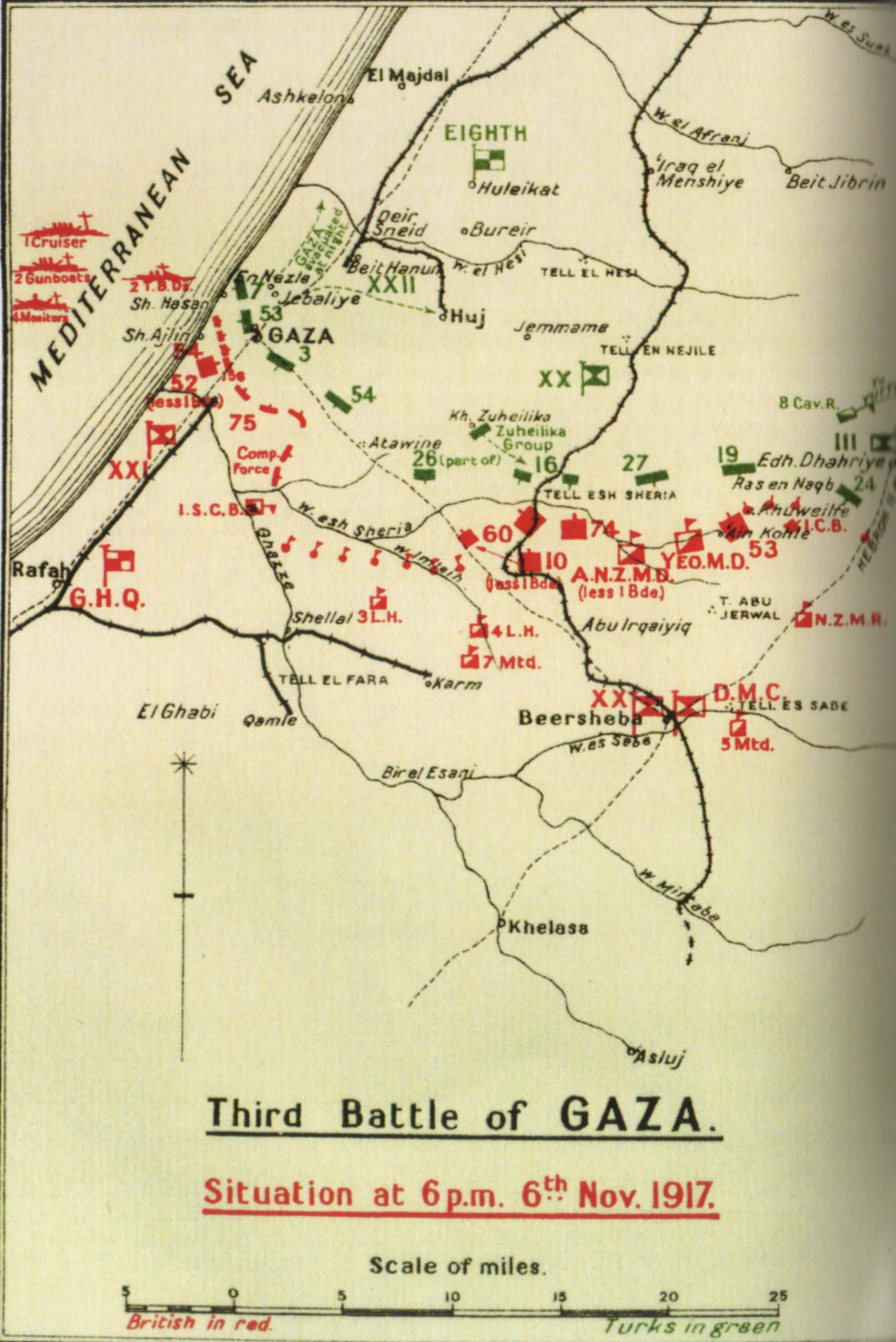
Situation at 18:00 on 6 November 1917

The attackers, reinforced by the 2/10th Middlesex, were ordered to hold their gains against a number of counterattacks, during which the 7th Battalion Royal Welch Fusiliers were pushed out of their position on the ridge. The last counterattack was finally repulsed at 15:30. The 158th Brigade suffered 620 casualties on 6 and 7 November, while the Imperial Camel Brigade suffered 76 casualties, the 2nd Light Horse Brigade Machine Gun Squadron suffered 27 casualties and the Middlesex 14 casualties, the Sussex casualties were unknown.

The 159th Brigade on the left was ordered to advance on Ain Kohle, but could not move forward. Several urgent requests were made during the day for a mobile reserve of a brigade or a regiment, but they were denied by Chauvel, who could not spare the reinforcements. Although the attack by the 53rd (Welsh) Division had been very confused, suffering a "bloody defeat" instead of a "conquest", the 19th Division was stopped from moving back to reinforce Tel esh Sheria. The continuing threat of an attack up the road to the headquarters of the Seventh Army at Hebron and on to Jerusalem, was maintained by the repeated attacks on Tel el Khuweilfe by the 53rd (Welsh) Division. By the end of the day, the Ottoman defenders had succeeded in defeating the British infantry attacks on Tel el Khuweilfe, and continued to hold Tel esh Sheria, but they had begun to evacuate Gaza. At nightfall, Chauvel issued orders for the Anzac and Australian Mounted Divisions to begin their advance northwards via Sheria towards Jemmameh and Huj, while Barrow commanding the Yeomanry Mounted Division was to take command of the force at Tel el Khuweilfe, including the 53rd (Welsh) Division.

We've had a successful day. We attacked the left of the Turkish positions, from N. of Beersheba, and have rolled them up as far as Sharia. The Turks fought well but have been badly defeated. Now, at 6 p.m., I am sending out orders to press in pursuit tomorrow. Gaza was not attacked; but I should not be surprised if this affected seriously her defenders. I am putting a lot of shell into them, and the Navy are still pounding them effectively.

— Allenby letter to Lady Allenby 6 November

== Aftermath ==
After the Ottoman 19th Division retreated from Tel el Khuweilfe the 53rd (Welsh) Division moved back to Beersheba.

Barrow's Detachment consisted of his Yeomanry Mounted Division, the 53rd (Welsh) Division, the Imperial Camel Brigade, the 11th and 12th Light Armoured Car Batteries, one squadron/four troops with eight machine guns of the 2nd Light Horse Machine Gun Squadron, the New Zealand Mounted Rifles Brigade in reserve, and supported by the 1st Australian Field Squadron. Allenby ordered this detachment commanded by Major General G. de S. Barrow, who took command at 04:00 on 7 November to hold the positions already gained, to protect the right flank from the large hostile force near Edh Dhahariye, and to take every opportunity to attack Ottoman forces in the area. Barrows was preparing for another attack to capture the remainder of Khuweilfe, which was cancelled. Mott commanding 53rd (Welsh) Division reported at 14:20 seeing hostile columns retiring north and requested cavalry reinforcements to cut them off from the XX Corps where Chetwode responded that it was "inadvisable" to move the cavalry while the attack on Tel esh Sheria was in progress. Barrow then ordered the Yeomanry Mounted Division to be ready at dawn for the advance. So it was that by 12:40 the leading squadrons of the Yeomanry Mounted Division were about three miles (4.8 km) north of Bir Abu Khuff being shelled by hostile artillery, having captured 31 prisoners. As a consequence the division arrived at Tel esh Sheria that night on their way to rejoining the Desert Mounted Corps.

However, the struggle for Khuweilfe Ridge continued without much change until the Ottoman force withdrew to conform with a general retirement.

During the morning of 8 November, Chauvel ordered the Yeomanry Mounted Division to rejoin Desert Mounted Corps "as quickly as possible". They arrived two days later. Meanwhile, the New Zealand Mounted Rifles Brigade came under the orders of the XX Corps at 16:00 on 8 November, when one squadron of Wellington Mounted Rifles Regiment was ordered to link the Imperial Camel Corps Brigade with the 53rd (Welsh) Division. On 9 November, the squadron was ordered to withdraw and arrived back in bivouac near Mikra at 21:00, to remain in the area in reserve until 11 November, when the Battle of Mughar Ridge began, and the brigade was ordered to rejoin the Anzac Mounted Division. The brigade rode out at 16:30 on 11 November to ride 52 miles (84 km) from Beersheba to rejoin their division at Hammameh on 12 November at 23:00. The Imperial Camel Brigade also returned to Chauvel's command on 11 November.

After the New Zealand Mounted Rifle Brigade and the Yeomanry Mounted Division rejoined Desert Mounted Corps, the remaining infantry force became known as Motts Detachment. In early December, during the Battle of Jerusalem, Mott's Detachment—consisting of the 53rd (Welsh) Division, the XX Corps Cavalry, the 91st Heavy Battery and the 11th Light Armoured Motor Battery—had advanced to near Edh Dhariye. The detachment was ordered to advance up the road to Jerusalem to cover the right flank of the attack. The detachment made a cautious move to be 5 miles (8.0 km) south west of Hebron on 1 December, leaving one infantry brigade guarding the road south from Dhahriye to Beersheba. This guard was found to be completely unnecessary, when two cars of the 7th Light Car Patrol arrived from the north during the day to inform Mott that, not only had all Ottoman forces withdrawn from Hebron, but there were no large Ottoman forces south of Bethlehem. However, the tentative advance continued so slowly that, at the crucial moment when the southern flank of the 60th (London) Division became exposed on 8 December, they were forced to pause during the battle.
