= XXI Corps (United Kingdom) =

- XXI Corps formation badge.
- Active: 12 August 1917–1919
- Country: United Kingdom
- Branch: British Army
- Type: Army Corps
- Part of: Egyptian Expeditionary Force
- Engagements: World War I: Sinai and Palestine Campaign; Beersheba; Third Gaza; Jaffa; Megiddo

Commanders
- Notable commanders: Lt-Gen Sir Edward Bulfin

The XXI Corps was an Army Corps of the British Army during World War I. The Corps was formed in Palestine in August 1917 under the command of Lieutenant General Edward Bulfin. It formed part of the Egyptian Expeditionary Force (EEF) and served in the Sinai and Palestine Campaign. At the Battle of Sharon it fought what has been described as 'one of the most overwhelmingly successful operations of the war' and 'a precursor to the modern Blitzkrieg.' It then carried out remarkable march up the coast of modern-day Lebanon as the war came to an end.

== Origin ==
When General Sir Edmund Allenby took over command of the Egyptian Expeditionary Force (EEF) in Palestine in the Summer of 1917, he completely reorganised it. XXI Corps Headquarters was formed on 12 August at Deir al-Balah to take responsibility for the left section of the EEF's line in front of Gaza City, including 52nd (Lowland), 54th (East Anglian) and 75th Divisions and three brigades of heavy artillery. It could also call on 10th (Irish) Division in GHQ Reserve. A signal company and XXI Corps Cavalry Regiment were formed for the corps, the latter by taking over three divisional cavalry squadrons. Major-General Edward Bulfin of 60th (2/2nd London) Division was promoted to Lieutenant-General to command the new formation, which was built up during the late summer for the resumption of the offensive in October.

== Service ==
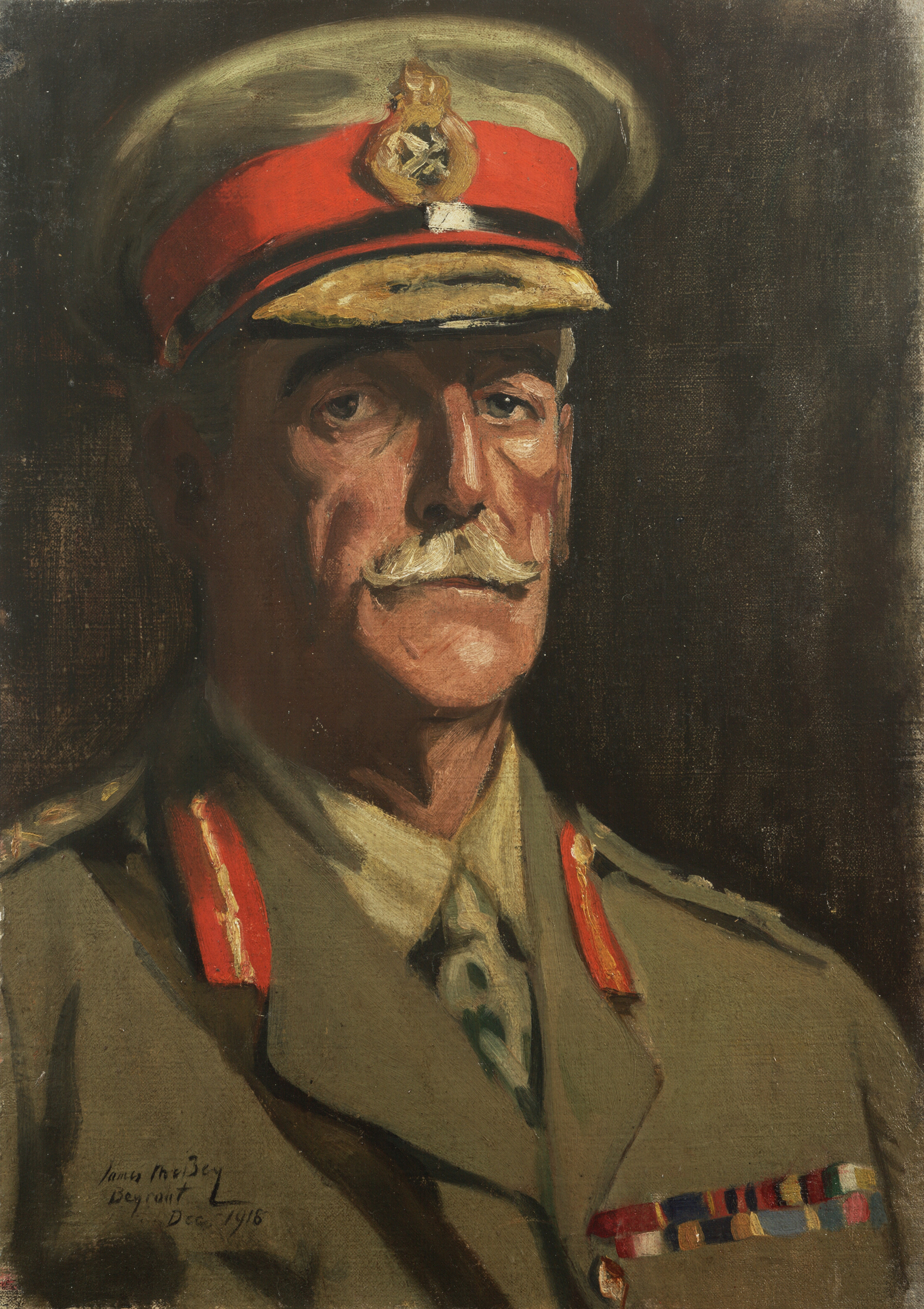
XXI Corps ' commander, Sir Edward Bulfin.

=== Order of Battle, October 1917 ===
The composition of the corps at the beginning of the Third Battle of Gaza was as follows:

- Corps Headquarters
  - General Officer Commanding, Lt-Gen Edward Bulfin
  - Brigadier-General, General Staff, Brig-Gen E.T. Humphreys
  - Deputy Adjutant and Quartermaster-General, Brig-Gen St. G.B. Armstrong
- 52nd (Lowland) Division, Maj-Gen John Hill
  - 155th (South Scottish) Brigade
  - 156th (Scottish Rifles) Brigade
  - 157th (Highland Light Infantry) Brigade
- 54th (East Anglian) Division, Maj-Gen Steuart Hare
  - 161st (Essex) Brigade
  - 162nd (East Midland) Brigade
  - 163rd (Norfolk and Suffolk) Brigade
- 75th Division, Maj-Gen Philip Palin
  - 232nd Brigade
  - 233rd Brigade
  - 234th Brigade
- XXI Corps Cavalry Regiment
  - A Squadron 1/1st Duke of Lancaster's Own Yeomanry
  - A Squadron 1/1st Hertfordshire Yeomanry
  - C Squadron 1/1st Queen's Own Royal Glasgow Yeomanry
- Commander, Corps Royal Artillery, Brig-Gen Hugh Simpson-Baikie
  - XCVII Heavy Artillery Group, Royal Garrison Artillery (RGA)
    - 189th and 195th Heavy Batteries
    - 201st, 205th, 300th and 380th Siege Batteries
  - C Heavy Artillery Group, RGA
    - 10th Heavy Battery
    - 43rd, 134th, 379th, 422nd and 423rd Siege Batteries
  - CII Heavy Artillery Group, RGA
    - 202nd Heavy Battery
    - 209th, 292nd, 420th, 421st and 424th Siege Batteries
  - XCV Heavy Artillery Group, RGA (HQ arrived by March 1918)
- Royal Engineers (RE), Chief Engineer, Brig-Gen R.P.T. Hawksley
  - XXI Corps Signal Company, RE
    - 21 Corps Wireless Section, RE
- Machine Gun Corps (MGC)
  - E Company, MGC (Heavy Branch), became Detachment Tank Corps, EEF
  - 211th Machine Gun Company

=== Invasion of Palestine ===
Third Battle of Gaza: situation at 18.00, 1 November 1917.

The EEF's offensive began with the Third Battle of Gaza. While the Desert Mounted Corps (DMC) and XX Corps prepared to break through the Turkish line at the Battle of Beersheba on 31 October, XXI Corps began a bombardment of the Gaza defences on 27 October, and carried out holding attacks on 1–3 November. By the night of 6/7 November the pressure from the direction of Beersheba was so great that the Turks began to evacuate Gaza. XXI Corps was ordered to pursue vigorously and capture Wadi el Hesi before the Turks could occupy the strong position there. 52nd (L) Division was brought up from corps reserve to carry this out with 157th Brigade in conjunction with the Imperial Service Cavalry Brigade (composed of Imperial Service Troops from the Princely states of India), which GHQ released for the task. XXI Corps Cavalry led the two brigades and quickly took Beit Lahi, but the IS Cavalry Bde had a lengthy approach march, came under fire as soon as it emerged from Gaza, and was unable to take Beit Hanoun that day. Meanwhile 157th Bde, hugging the cliffs, had advanced along the beach across the mouth of the wadi. Next day 52nd (L) Division attacked inland against Sausage Ridge, while XXI Corps Cavalry swept round Beit Hanoun, overrunning some retreating Turkish heavy artillery and making contact with the Australian Mounted Division of the DMC.

The advance then continued and XXI Corps was involved in the following actions:

- Battle of Mughar Ridge:
  - Action at Burqa 12 November
  - Mughar Ridge 13 November
  - Occupation of Junction Station 14 November
- Battle of Nebi Samwil 17–24 November
- Defence of Jerusalem 27–28 November
- Battle of Jaffa 11–22 December:
  - Passage of the Nahr el Auja 21 December
- Battle of Tell 'Asur 8–12 March 1918:
  - Fight at Ras el 'Ain 12 March
- Action of Berukin 9–10 April

=== Order of Battle, September 1918 ===
Following the German Spring Offensive on the Western Front in March 1918, the EEF was obliged to send reinforcements to the British Expeditionary Force. Many of its units and formations were replaced by others from the Indian Army (of the infantry divisions only 54th (East Anglian) was not 'Indianised'). The EEF was then reorganised during the summer of 1918 in preparation for the final offensive. The composition of XXI Corps at the beginning of the Battle of Megiddo was as follows:

- Corps HQ
  - GOC, Lt-Gen Sir Edward Bulfin
  - BGGS, Brig-Gen H.F. Salt
  - DAQMG, Brig-Gen St. G.B. Armstrong
- 3rd (Lahore) Division, Maj-Gen Reginald Hoskins
  - 7th Indian Brigade
  - 8th Indian Brigade
  - 9th Indian Brigade
- 7th (Meerut) Division Maj-Gen Sir Vere Fane
  - 19th Indian Brigade
  - 21st Indian Brigade
  - 28th Indian Brigade (Frontier Force)
- 54th (East Anglian) Division, Maj-Gen Steuart Hare
  - 161st (Essex) Brigade
  - 162nd (East Midland) Brigade
  - 163rd (Norfolk and Suffolk) Brigade
  - Détachement Français de Palestine et de Syrie, Colonel Giles de Piépape
    - Régiment de Marche de Tirailleurs
    - Régiment de Marche de la Légion d'Orient
- 60th Division, Maj-Gen John Shea
  - 179th Brigade
  - 180th Brigade
  - 181st Brigade
- 75th Division, Maj-Gen Philip Palin
  - 232nd Brigade
  - 233rd Brigade
  - 233rd Brigade
- 5th Australian Light Horse Brigade
- XXI Corps Cavalry Regiment
  - A Sqn 1/1st Duke of Lancaster's Own Yeomanry
  - A and B Sqns 1/1st Hertfordshire Yeomanry
- Commander, Corps RA, Brig-Gen Hugh Simpson-Baikie
  - XCV Brigade, RGA
    - 181st Heavy Bty
    - 304th, 314th, 383rd and 422nd Siege Btys
  - XCVI Brigade, RGA
    - 189th and 202nd Heavy Btys
    - 378th and 394th Siege Btys
  - C Brigade, RGA
    - 15th Heavy Bty
    - 134th and 334th Siege Btys, sections 43rd and 300th Siege Btys
  - CII Brigade, RGA
    - 91st Heavy Bty
    - 209th, 380th and 440th Siege Btys, sections 43rd and 300th Siege Btys
  - VIII Mountain Brigade, RGA
    - 11th, 13th and 17th Mountain Btys
  - IX Mountain Brigade, RGA
    - 10th, 12th and 16th Mountain Btys
- Royal Engineers, Chief Engineer, Brig-Gen R.P.T. Hawksley
  - 13th Pontoon Park, RE (also known as 13th Base Park Company, RE)
  - 14th Army Troops Company, RE
  - XXI Corps Signal Company, RE
    - 21 Corps Wireless Section, RE

=== Final Offensive ===
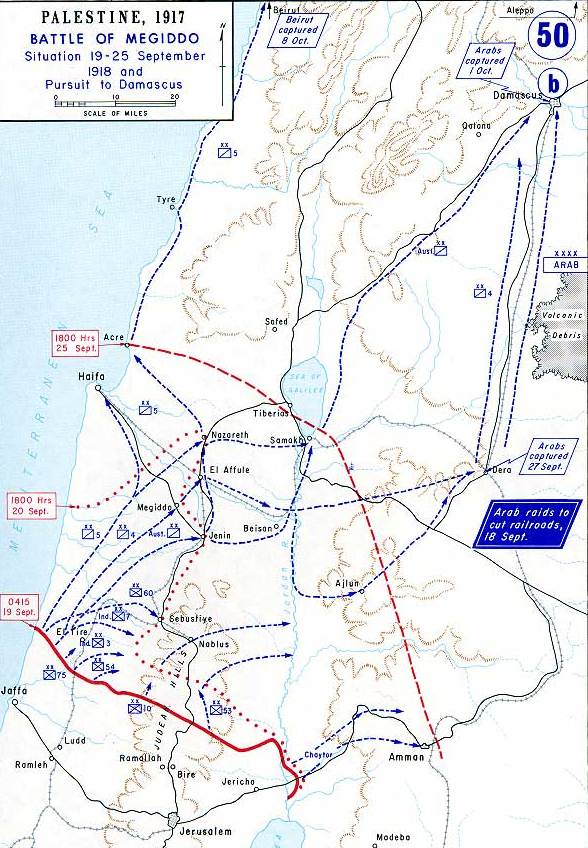
Progress of the Megiddo offensive

The Battle of Megiddo was launched on 19 September. XXI Corps, with five infantry divisions and a cavalry brigade, had the task of breaking through Turkish trench lines that in places were5 miles (8.0 km) deep. However, it had overwhelming superiority in artillery and was aided by deception plans. The corps had established a bridging school on the Nahr el Auja two months earlier and the Turks had become accustomed to pontoon bridges being laid and then dismantled: on the night of 18/19 September they were left in place for the assault troops to use next morning. During the Battle of Sharon (or Battle of Tulkarm) XXI Corps broke through and overwhelmed the right of the strong Turkish defence system from Biddya to the sea. XXI Corps next began a pursuit over the Plain of Sharon and captured Nablus on 21 September. Action on XXI Corps' front then ceased while the rest of the EEF kept up the pressure on the Turks. The Official History described the part played by XXI Corps in the battle as 'one of the most overwhelmingly successful operations of the war', and praised the staff for their efforts to supply water as the advance progressed.

After the Battle of Sharon XXI Corps' divisions were employed on salvage work and road repair. 54th (EA) Division concentrated at Haifa, 60th and 75th Divisions left the corps and came directly under GHQ, while 3rd (Indian) Division did garrison duty under the DMC. By late September the EEF was closing in on Damascus and ordered XXI Corps to secure the coast and ports of Syria. 7th (Indian) Division, which had already shown remarkable powers of marching, was ordered to march to Beirut along the coast road. Starting on 29 September, the division advanced in three columns, Column A consisted of XXI Corps Cavalry Regiment, a light armoured motor battery (armoured cars), and a single infantry company; the Indian Sapper companies and Pioneer battalion followed with Column B. On 2 October the division was confronted by the Ladder of Tyre, a narrow ancient track consisting of steps cut into the cliff. There was no alternative route. Extensive engineering work would be required to make it passable for wheeled vehicles, with the danger of the whole cliff shelf falling into the sea. After a few minutes' consideration, Bulfin ordered the engineers to begin work. The task of preparing the half-mile (800 m) track took two-and-a-half days, but was successfully completed so that the 60-pounder guns of 15th Heavy Bty, RGA, could get through. Before it was completed, XXI Corps Cavalry Regiment advanced cross-country on 4 October and entered Tyre, where the Royal Navy landed supplies for the columns. On 6 October the advanced troops secured Sidon, where further supplies were landed, and on 8 October they entered Beirut, where Corps HQ was established in the Deutscherhof' Hotel.

On 11 October Column A was suddenly ordered to occupy Tripoli, 65 miles (105 km) further on, by the evening of 13 October, which it achieved, arriving in moonlight. The leading infantry brigade of 7th (Indian) Division arrived on 18 October, having covered 270 miles (430 km) in 40 days. The leading troops of 54th (EA) Division began arriving on 31 October, the day on which hostilities in the theatre were ended Armistice of Mudros.

== General Officers Commanding ==
The following officers commanded the corps during its service:

- Lieutenant-General Edward Bulfin 18 August 1917 – 13 June 1918
- Major-General Sir Vere Fane 13 June – 14 August 1918 (acting)
- Major-General Reginald Hoskins 14–19 August 1918 (acting)
- Lieutenant-General Sir Edward Bulfin 19 August – November 1918

== See also ==
- Military history of the United Kingdom
- List of British corps in World War I
- Egyptian Expeditionary Force
