= Kedma, Israel =

Youth village in southern Israel

Kedma: קדמה (Hebrew); كدما (Arabic)
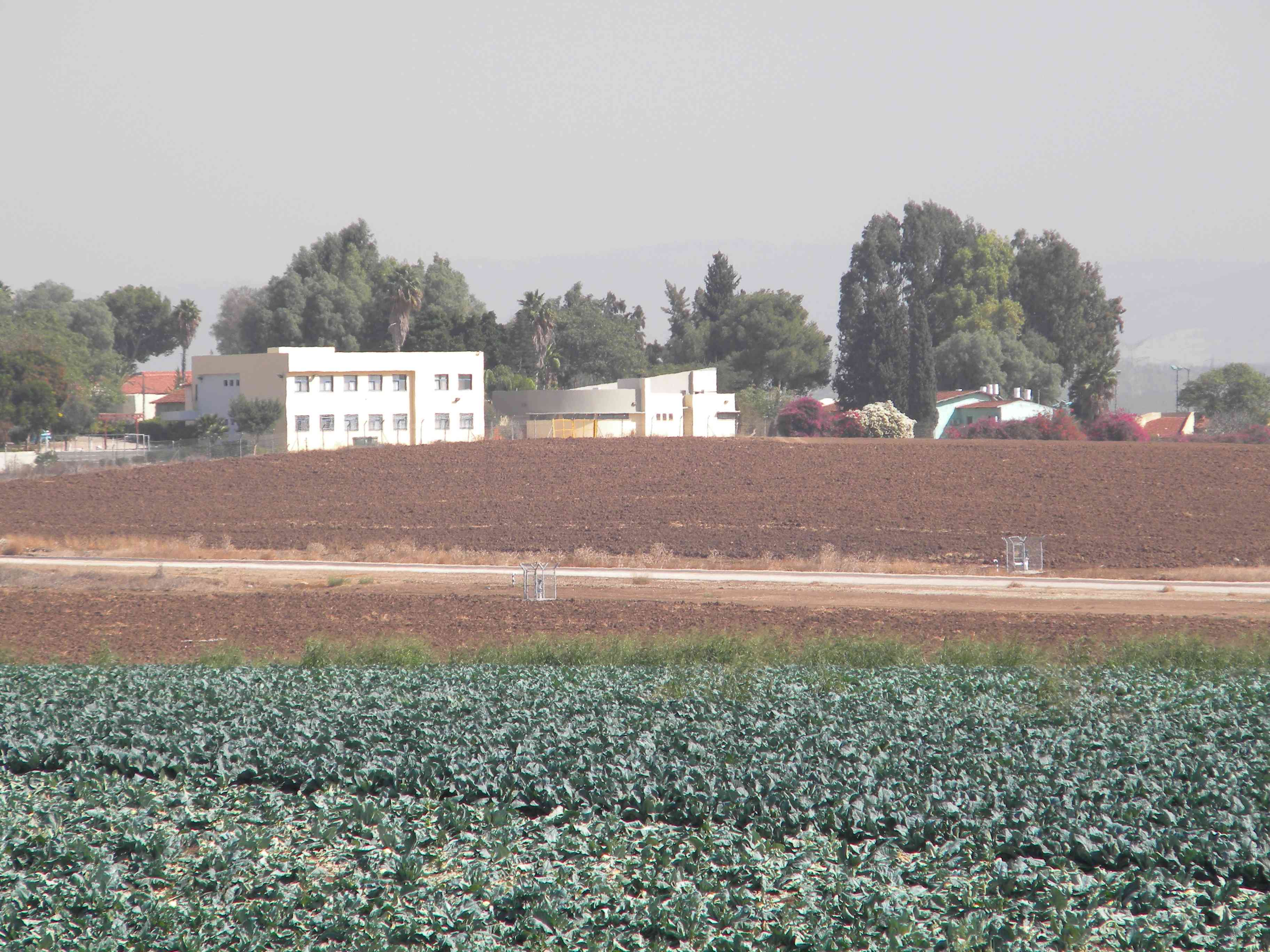

- Location within Ashkelon region of Israel Location within Israel
- Coordinates: 31°42′5″N 34°46′32″E
- Country: Israel
- District: Southern
- Subdistrict: Ashkelon
- Council: Yoav
- Founded: 1946

Kedma (Hebrew: קֵדְמָה) is a youth village in south-central Israel. Located in the southern Shephelah, it falls under the jurisdiction of Yoav Regional Council.

== History ==
Kedma was founded as a kibbutz as part of the 11 points in the Negev campaign in 1946. It was founded on land of the depopulated Palestinian village of Summil. After 1948, it also started to farm some of the land belonging to Bil'in.

Because of social and economic difficulties the kibbutz was abandoned in 1962. In 1971 a group of American Jewish youths settled on the site in an unsuccessful attempt to revive the community. It was reconstituted as a youth village in 1979.
