= Dayr Sunayd =

Dayr Sunayd دير سنيد Deir Suneid, Deir Sineid, Der Esned
- Etymology: "Monastery of the declivity"
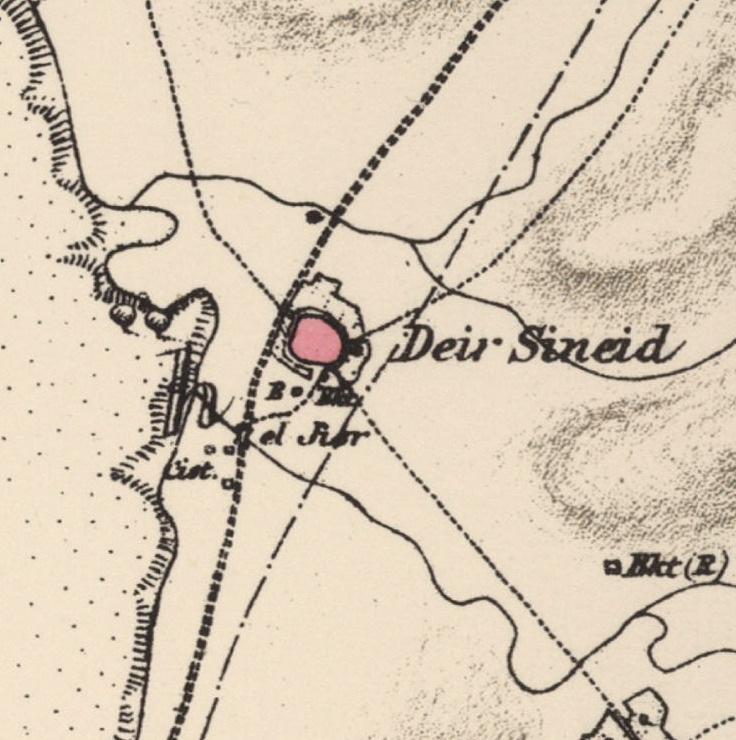
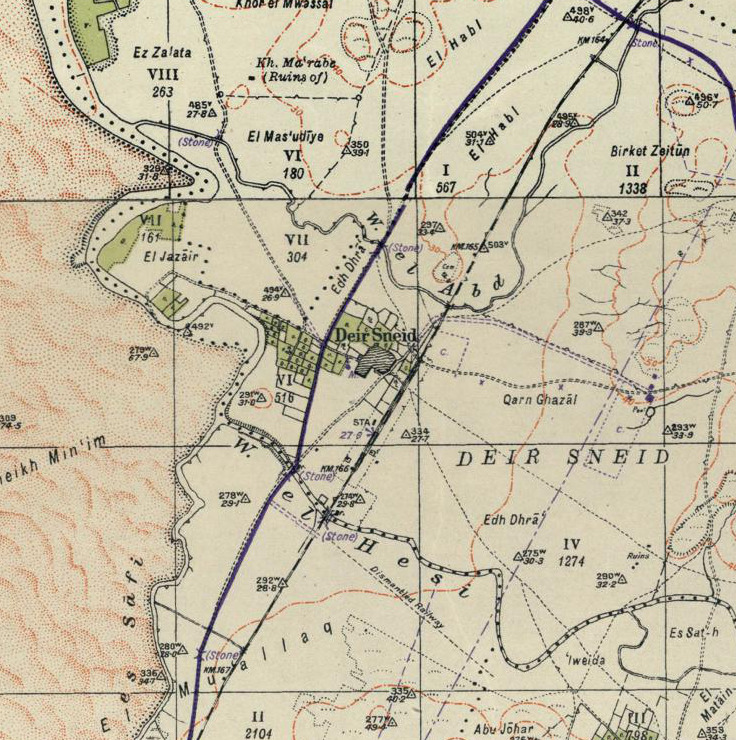
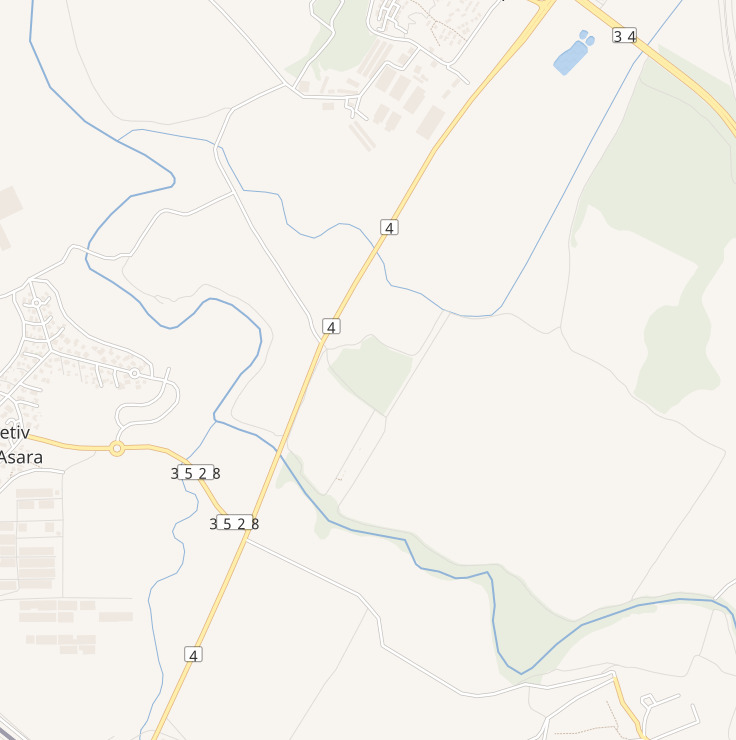
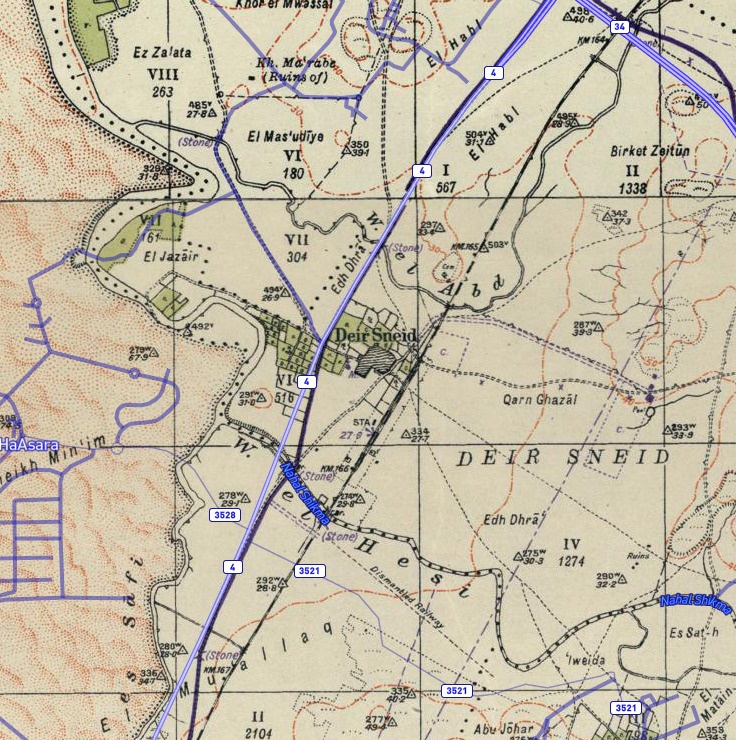
- 1870s map 1940s map modern map 1940s with modern overlay map A series of historical maps of the area around Dayr Sunayd (click the buttons)

- Location within Mandatory Palestine
- Coordinates: 31°34′28″N 34°33′18″E
- Palestine grid: 107/109
- Geopolitical entity: Mandatory Palestine
- Subdistrict: Gaza
- Date of depopulation: Late October or early November 1948

Area
  - Total: 6.1 km^{2} (2.4 sq mi)

Population (1945)
  - Total: 730
- Cause(s) of depopulation: Military assault by Yishuv forces
- Current Localities: None

Dayr Sunayd (Arabic: دير سنيد) was a Palestinian Arab village in the Gaza Subdistrict, located 12 kilometers (7.5 mi) northeast of Gaza. Situated at an elevation of 50 meters (160 ft) along the southern coastal plain of Palestine, Deir Sunayd had a total land area of 6,081 dunams. Prior to its depopulation during the 1948 Arab–Israeli War, it had 730 inhabitants in 1945.

== History ==
The first part of its name "Dayr" is Arabic for "Monastery", suggesting that it was once the site of a monastic order or a Christian population possibly resided there at one point of time. "Sunayd" was the name of an Arab tribe in the area.

=== Ottoman era ===
Under the Ottoman Empire, in the 1596 tax records, Dayr Sunayd was noted in the nahiya of Gaza, part of Sanjak of Gaza, with a population of 12 households, an estimated 66 persons, all Muslim. The villagers paid a fixed tax rate of 33.3% on various agricultural products, including wheat, barley, fruit, beehives and goats; a total of 4,600 akçe.

During the 17th and 18th centuries, the area of Dayr Sunayd experienced a significant process of settlement decline due to nomadic pressures on local communities. The residents of abandoned villages moved to surviving settlements, but the land continued to be cultivated by neighboring villages. The village survived to appear under the name of Deir Esni on the map that Pierre Jacotin compiled from data collected in 1799.

In 1838, Edward Robinson noted it under the name of Deir Esneid; a Muslim village, located in the Gaza district.

In 1863, French explorer Victor Guérin found the village, which he called Deir Essneid, to have 150 inhabitants. Its gardens were mainly planted with figs. An Ottoman village list from about 1870 found that the village had a population of 144, in a total of 51 houses, though the population count included men, only.

In the late 19th century, Dayr Sunayd was a moderate-sized village that was rectangular in shape, split into four quadrants by two roads that crossed at right angles. It had adobe brick houses, eight wells, gardens, a pond, and at the center of the village was a mosque.

=== British Mandate era ===
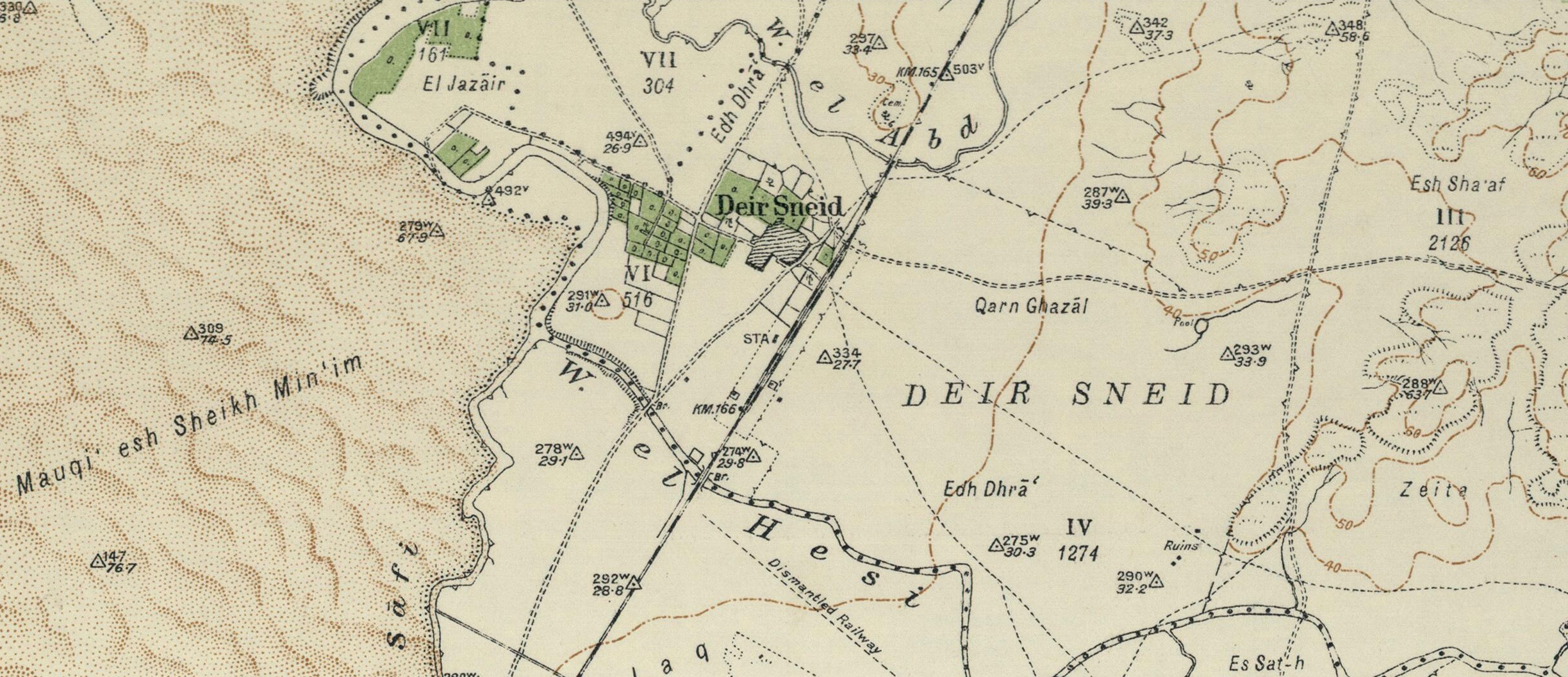
Dayr Sunayd 1931 1:20,000

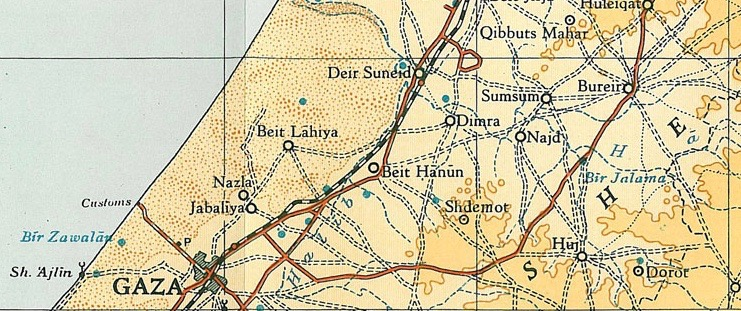
Dayr Sunayd 1945

In the 1922 census of Palestine, conducted by the British Mandate authorities, Dair Sunait had a population of 356 inhabitants, all Muslims, increasing in the 1931 census to 475, still all Muslim, in 103 houses.

By the end of the British Mandate period, Dayr Sunayd had expanded west toward the coastal highway. A school was opened in 1945 with an enrollment of 63 students and a number of small shops were opened there as well. Agriculture was the primary source of income for most residents, followed by commerce.

In the 1945 statistics Dayr Sunayd had a population of 730, all Muslims, with a total of 6,081 dunams of land, according to an official land and population survey. Of this, 158 dunams were used for citrus and bananas, 512 dunams were for plantations and irrigable land, 4,863 for cereals, while 13 dunams were built-up land.

=== 1948 War and aftermath ===
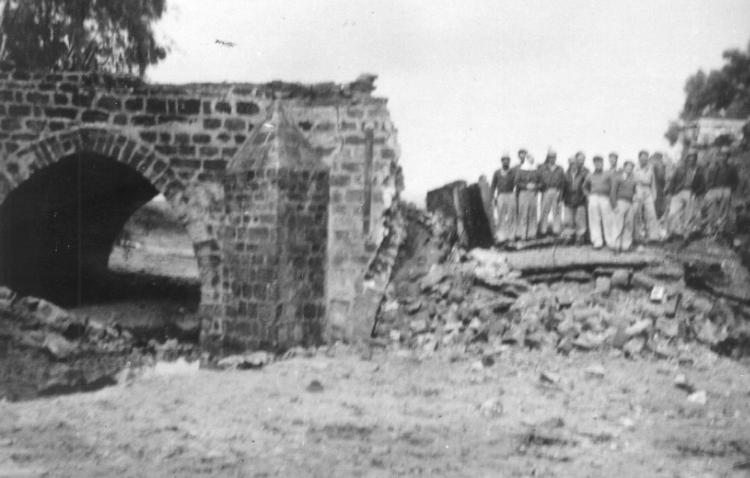
Yiftach Brigade, 1st Battalion on demolished bridge in Dayr Sunayd during Operation Yoav, October 1948

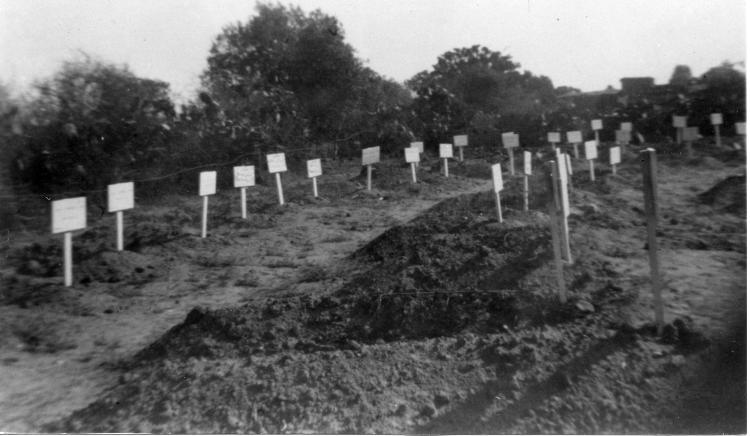
Egyptian graveyard, Dayr Sunayd. 1948

The date on which Dayr Sunayd was captured during the 1948 Arab-Israeli War cannot be specified, but the village was probably seized by Israeli forces in late October or early November 1948. It had come under aerial bombardment in Operation Yoav on October 15–16, according to Israeli historian Benny Morris. The New York Times reported that it was "pummeled" again on October 21.

Dayr Sunayd also witnessed fighting in the early stages if the war, as Egyptian and Jewish forces battled for control of the village and the nearby town of Yad Mordechai shortly after May 15, 1948. The late president of Egypt, Gamal Abdel Nasser said that when he spent the night at the Gaza Military Hospital, "the beds around me were filled with our wounded from the battle of Dayr Sunayd, which was still in progress". Abdel Nasser was critical of the Egyptian command's strategy at the battle, but nonetheless, it ended in an Egyptian victory "after heavy sacrifices and in spite of all the difficulties our forces encountered". Abdel Nasser's colleague Abdel Hakim Amer participated in the battle.

Following the war the area was incorporated into the State of Israel, with the village's lands left undeveloped. According to Palestinian historian Walid Khalidi, the remains of Dayr Sunayd consisted in 1992 of "A railroad bridge, unused segments of track, and three of the train station's buildings are all that remain of Dayr Sunayd. The stone bridge is built astride a wadi and passes over four wide, round-arched culverts. The station's buildings are deserted and in a state of deterioration."

== See also ==
- Depopulated Palestinian locations in Israel

== Bibliography ==
- Barron, J. B., ed. (1923). Palestine: Report and General Abstracts of the Census of 1922. Government of Palestine.
- Conder, C.R.; Kitchener, H. H. (1883). The Survey of Western Palestine: Memoirs of the Topography, Orography, Hydrography, and Archaeology. Vol. 3. London: Committee of the Palestine Exploration Fund.
- Department of Statistics (1945). Village Statistics, April, 1945. Government of Palestine.
- Guérin, V. (1869). Description Géographique Historique et Archéologique de la Palestine (in French). Vol. 1: Judee, pt. 2. Paris: L'Imprimerie Nationale.
- Hadawi, S. (1970). Village Statistics of 1945: A Classification of Land and Area ownership in Palestine. Palestine Liberation Organization Research Center.
- Hartmann, M. (1883). "Die Ortschaftenliste des Liwa Jerusalem in dem türkischen Staatskalender für Syrien auf das Jahr 1288 der Flucht (1871)". Zeitschrift des Deutschen Palästina-Vereins. 6: 102–149.
- Hütteroth, W.-D.; Abdulfattah, K. (1977). Historical Geography of Palestine, Transjordan and Southern Syria in the Late 16th Century. Erlanger Geographische Arbeiten, Sonderband 5. Erlangen, Germany: Vorstand der Fränkischen Geographischen Gesellschaft. ISBN 3-920405-41-2.
- Karmon, Y. (1960). "An Analysis of Jacotin's Map of Palestine" (PDF). Israel Exploration Journal. 10 (3, 4): 155–173, 244–253. Archived from the original (PDF) on 2019-12-22.
- Khalidi, W. (1992). All That Remains: The Palestinian Villages Occupied and Depopulated by Israel in 1948. Washington D.C.: Institute for Palestine Studies. ISBN 0-88728-224-5.
- Mills, E., ed. (1932). Census of Palestine 1931. Population of Villages, Towns and Administrative Areas. Jerusalem: Government of Palestine.
- Morris, B. (2004). The Birth of the Palestinian Refugee Problem Revisited. Cambridge University Press. ISBN 978-0-521-00967-6.
- Nasser, G.A. (1955/1973): "Memoirs" in Journal of Palestine Studies
  - in 2, no. 2 (Win. 73): 3–32]
- Palmer, E. H. (1881). The Survey of Western Palestine: Arabic and English Name Lists Collected During the Survey by Lieutenants Conder and Kitchener, R. E. Transliterated and Explained by E.H. Palmer. Committee of the Palestine Exploration Fund.
- Robinson, E.; Smith, E. (1841). Biblical Researches in Palestine, Mount Sinai and Arabia Petraea: A Journal of Travels in the year 1838. Vol. 2. Boston: Crocker & Brewster.
- Robinson, E.; Smith, E. (1841). Biblical Researches in Palestine, Mount Sinai and Arabia Petraea: A Journal of Travels in the year 1838. Vol. 3. Boston: Crocker & Brewster.
- Socin, A. (1879). "Alphabetisches Verzeichniss von Ortschaften des Paschalik Jerusalem". Zeitschrift des Deutschen Palästina-Vereins. 2: 135–163.
