= Bil'in, Gaza =

Bil'in بعلين
- Village
- Etymology: Balin, from personal name
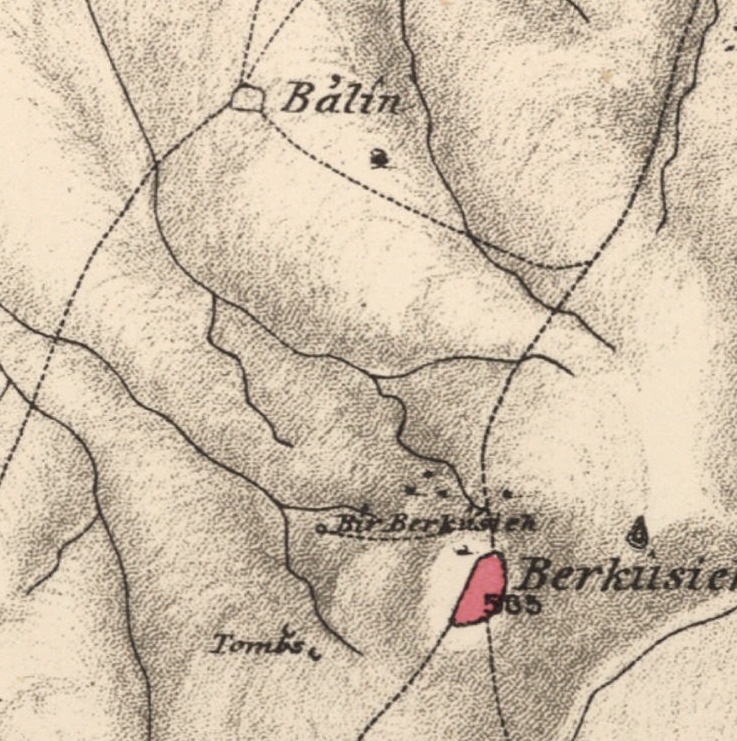
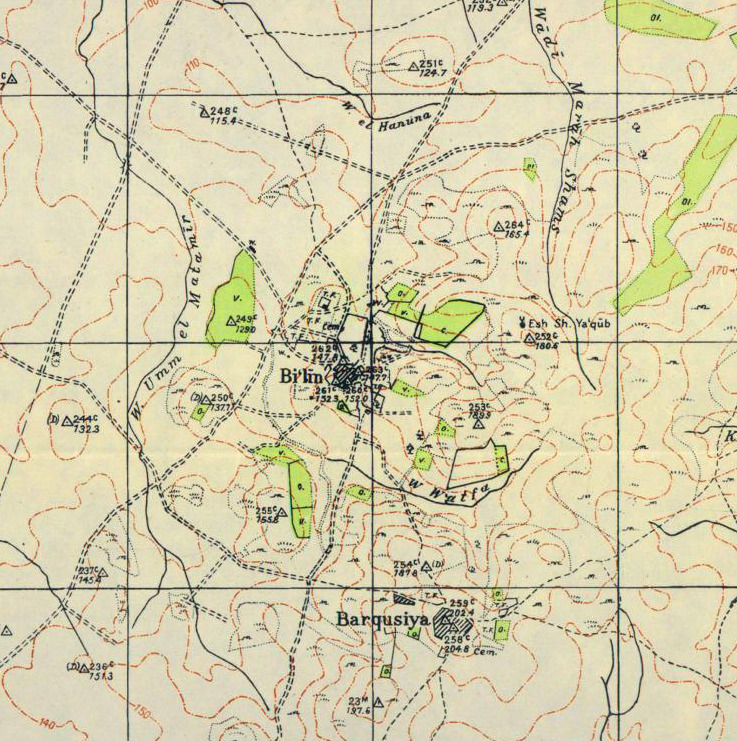
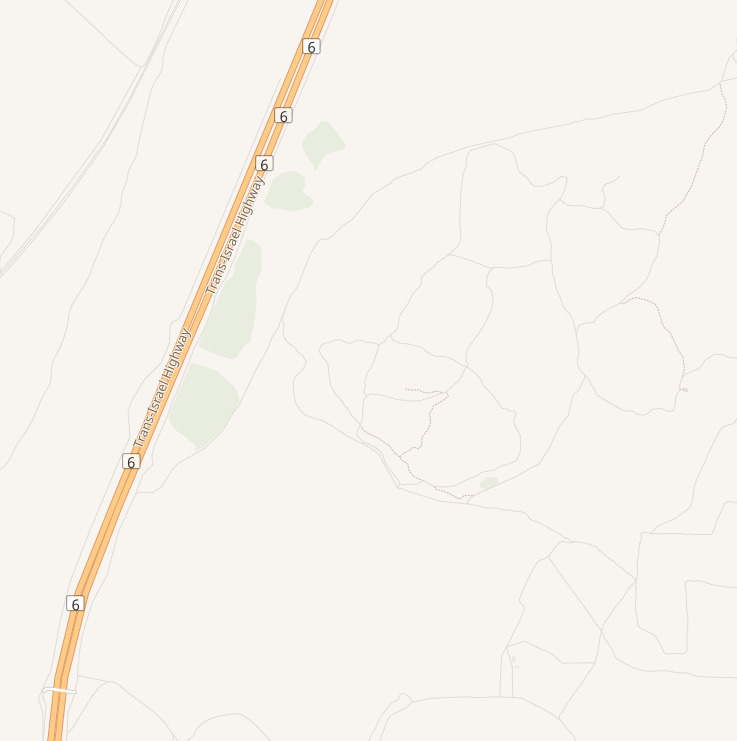
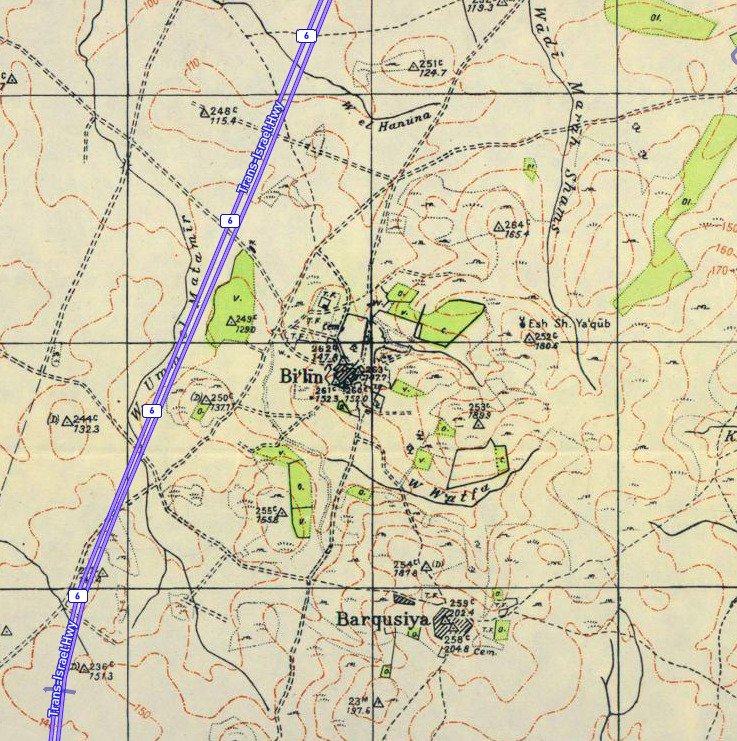
- 1870s map 1940s map modern map 1940s with modern overlay map A series of historical maps of the area around Bil'in, Gaza (click the buttons)

- Location within Mandatory Palestine
- Coordinates: 31°41′20″N 34°49′11″E
- Palestine grid: 132/121
- Geopolitical entity: Mandatory Palestine
- Subdistrict: Gaza
- Date of depopulation: Not known

Area
  - Total: 8,036 dunams (8.036 km^{2}; 3.103 sq mi)

Population (1945)
  - Total: 180
- Current Localities: Qedma

Bil'in was a Palestinian Arab village in the Gaza Subdistrict. It was depopulated by the Israel Defense Forces during the 1948 Arab–Israeli War on July 8, 1948, under Operation An-Far. It was located 39 km northeast of Gaza and the village contained two wells which supplied it with drinking water.

== Etymology ==
Biʽīln derives from Canaanite/Hebrew ba'lin (ba'als).

== History ==
Bil'in did not appear in records from the 16th century. It was a small village in the 19th century, settled by families that were once nomads in the Shephelah and had origins in Bayt Jibrin and Iraq al-Manshiyya.

In 1838 it was noted as a Muslim village, Ba'lin, in the Gaza district, being smaller than nearby Barqusya.

In 1863 Victor Guérin noted it as a small village on a mound.

In 1882, the PEF's Survey of Western Palestine described it as being a small adobe village, "with no traces of antiquity".

=== British Mandate era ===
In the 1922 census of Palestine conducted by the British Mandate authorities, Bil'in had a population of 101 Muslims, increasing by the 1931 census to 127, still all Muslim, in 32 houses.

In the 1945 statistics, the village together with Ard el Ishra had a population of 180 Muslims, and the land area was 8,036 dunams, according to an official land and population survey. Of this, 143 dunams were for plantations and irrigable land, 6,972 for cereals, while 6 dunams were built-up areas.

Bi'lin had an elementary school which was founded in 1937 and a shrine for al-Shaykh Ya'qub.

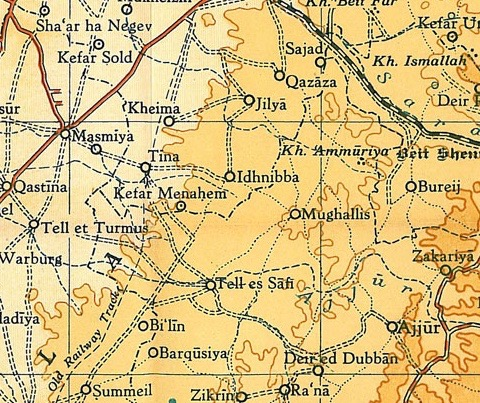
Bil'in 1945 1:250,000 (bottom left quadrant)

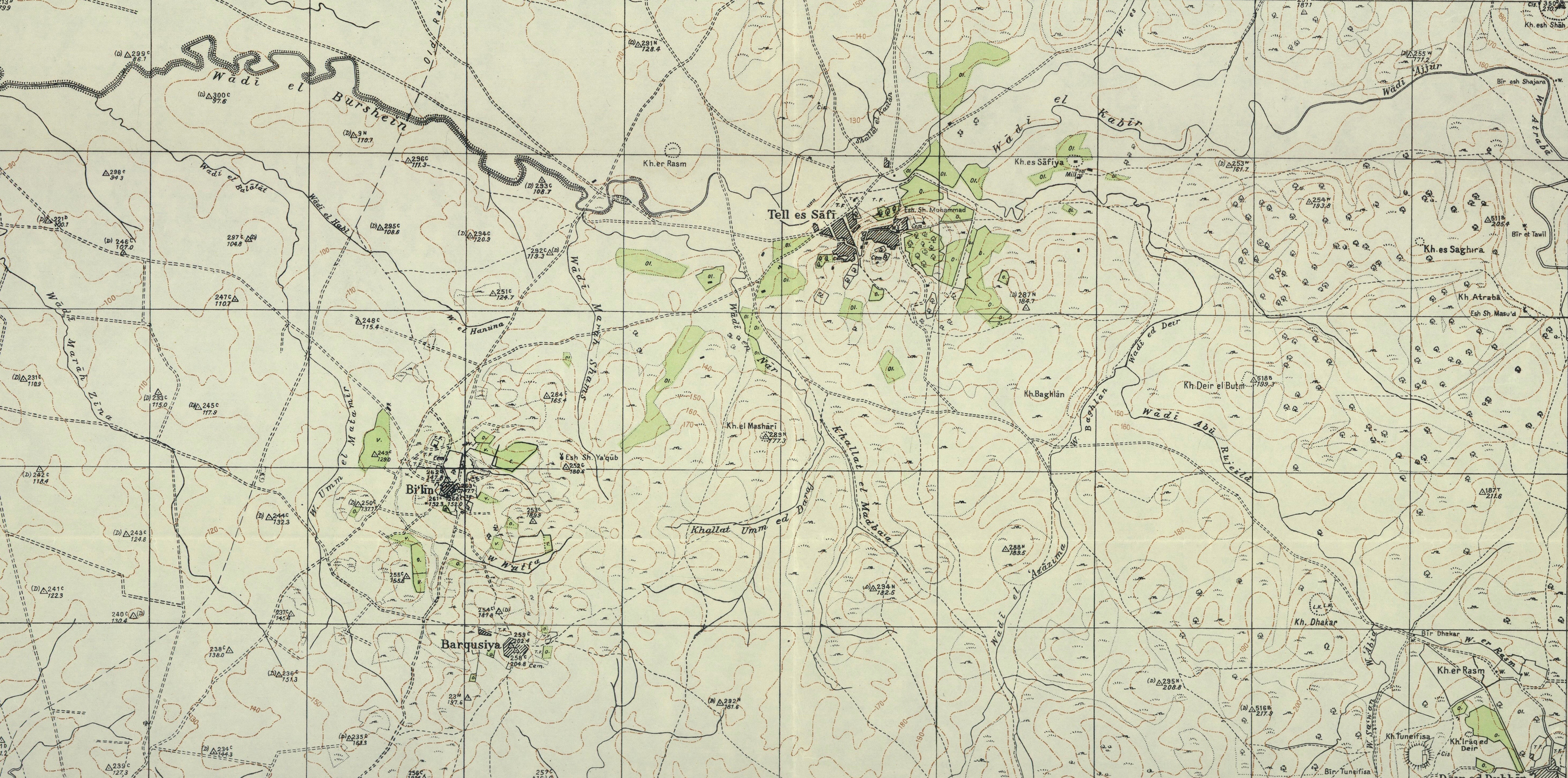
Bil'in 1948 1:20,000

=== Post 1948 ===
Qedma started using some of the village land after 1948.

In 1992 the village site was described: "All that remains is the rubble of a few houses, with wild herbs and thorns growing on the site, along with some trees and cactus plants. The site is surrounded by barbed wire. Parts of the surrounding land are planted with mango trees and grapes, while others serve as pastures."

== Bibliography ==
- Barron, J.B., ed. (1923). Palestine: Report and General Abstracts of the Census of 1922. Government of Palestine.
- Conder, C.R.; Kitchener, H.H. (1882). The Survey of Western Palestine: Memoirs of the Topography, Orography, Hydrography, and Archaeology. Vol. 2. London: Committee of the Palestine Exploration Fund.
- Government of Palestine, Department of Statistics (1945). Village Statistics, April, 1945.
- Guérin, V. (1869). Description Géographique Historique et Archéologique de la Palestine (in French). Vol. 1: Judee, pt. 2. Paris: L'Imprimerie Nationale.
- Hadawi, S. (1970). Village Statistics of 1945: A Classification of Land and Area ownership in Palestine. Palestine Liberation Organization Research Centre.
- Khalidi, W. (1992). All That Remains: The Palestinian Villages Occupied and Depopulated by Israel in 1948. Washington D.C.: Institute for Palestine Studies. ISBN 0-88728-224-5.
- Mills, E., ed. (1932). Census of Palestine 1931. Population of Villages, Towns and Administrative Areas. Jerusalem: Government of Palestine.
- Morris, B. (2004). The Birth of the Palestinian Refugee Problem Revisited. Cambridge University Press. ISBN 978-0-521-00967-6.
- Palmer, E.H. (1881). The Survey of Western Palestine: Arabic and English Name Lists Collected During the Survey by Lieutenants Conder and Kitchener, R. E. Transliterated and Explained by E.H. Palmer. Committee of the Palestine Exploration Fund.
- Robinson, E.; Smith, E. (1841). Biblical Researches in Palestine, Mount Sinai and Arabia Petraea: A Journal of Travels in the year 1838. Vol. 2. Boston: Crocker & Brewster.
- Robinson, E.; Smith, E. (1841). Biblical Researches in Palestine, Mount Sinai and Arabia Petraea: A Journal of Travels in the year 1838. Vol. 3. Boston: Crocker & Brewster.
