= Archibald Herbert Leggett =

British army officer (1877–1936)

Brigadier-General Archibald Herbert Leggett CMG DSO
- Born: 2 August 1877; West Derby, Liverpool
- Died: 18 April 1936 (aged 58); Epsom, Surrey
- Burial place: St Giles churchyard, Ashtead
- Military career
- Allegiance: United Kingdom
- Branch: British Army
- Rank: Brigadier-General
- Unit: Royal Scots Fusiliers
- Awards: Companion of the Order of St Michael and St George; Companion of the Distinguished Service Order

Brigadier-General Archibald Herbert Leggett, (2 August 1877 – 18 April 1936) was a British Army officer during the Second Boer War and World War I.

== Military career ==
Leggett was born in 1877, the son of Major G. E. Leggett, 77th (East Middlesex) Regiment of Foot, and was educated at Clifton College. He was commissioned into the British Army as a second lieutenant with the Royal Scots Fusiliers on 15 May 1897, and promoted to lieutenant on 6 June 1899.

He served in the Second Boer War with the 2nd battalion of his regiment. They were part of the force to relieve Ladysmith, including the battles of Colenso (December 1899), Spion Kop (January 1900), Vaal Krantz and Tugela Heights (February 1900) before relieving Ladysmith on 1 March 1900. He subsequently served in Natal March to April 1900, then in the Transvaal from May 1900, including west of Pretoria and action at Frederickstad. He was adjutant of the 2nd battalion from 12 November 1900 to late 1902, and was promoted to captain on 25 September 1901, when he served in Cape Colony, north of the Orange River. For his service in the war, he was mentioned in despatches, appointed a Companion of the Distinguished Service Order (DSO) and received the Queen's South Africa Medal with four clasps and the King's South Africa Medal with two clasps.

After the end of the war in South Africa, Leggett was in January 1903 seconded for service on the Staff, and posted to the Royal Military College, Sandhurst where he was instructor from 1903 to 1907. He served in Japan, 1908–1910, where he was attached to British Embassy, Tokyo, 1909–1910; during which he passed as 2nd Class Interpreter in Japanese, and served for 6 months with 29th Regt Infantry, Imperial Japanese Army. He was subsequently Brigade-Major, Hampshire Infantry Brigade, 1911–1913; and retired from the army in 1913.

He returned to the army to serve in World War I from 1915 to 1918, and commanded the Fifth Battalion (Territorial Force) of his regiment 1915-1917, then the 156th Infantry Brigade 1917–1919. He distinguished himself, receiving mention in dispatches six times, was appointed Companion of the Order of St Michael and St George (CMG) in 1918, and received brevet promotions to major in 1916 and lieutenant colonel in 1918. He was also granted the 3rd class of the Imperial Russian Order of Saint Anna in 1916 and the 3rd Class of the Order of Crown of Belgium in 1919. He was subsequently granted the honorary rank of brigader-general on demobilisation.

After retiring from the Army, Leggett headed the organization department of the Federation of British Industries.

Leggatt married in 1903 Lilian Rose O′Neal, elder daughter of Major J. C. O′Neal, 6th (Inniskilling) Dragoons. They had two sons and a daughter.
