= Al-Jaladiyya =

Al-Jaladiyya الجلدية
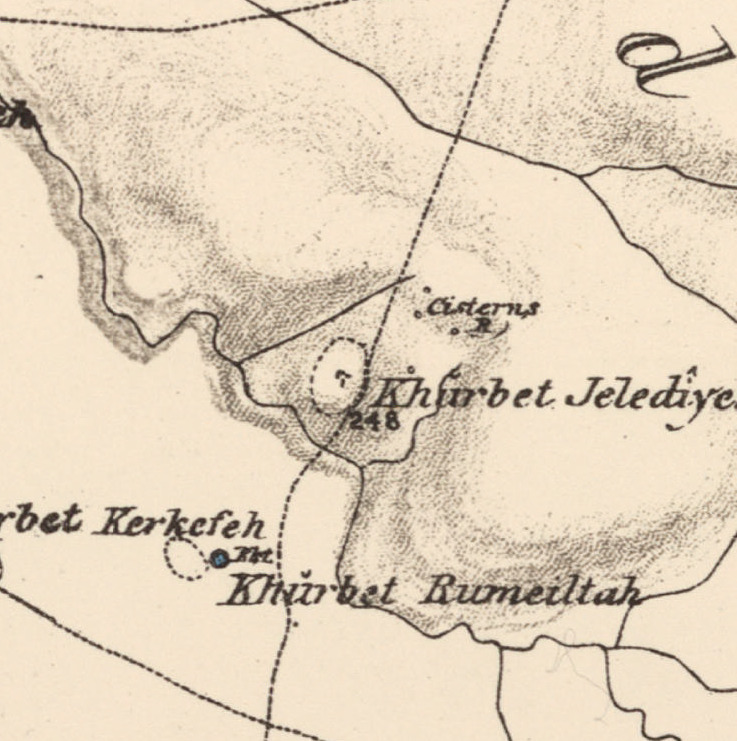
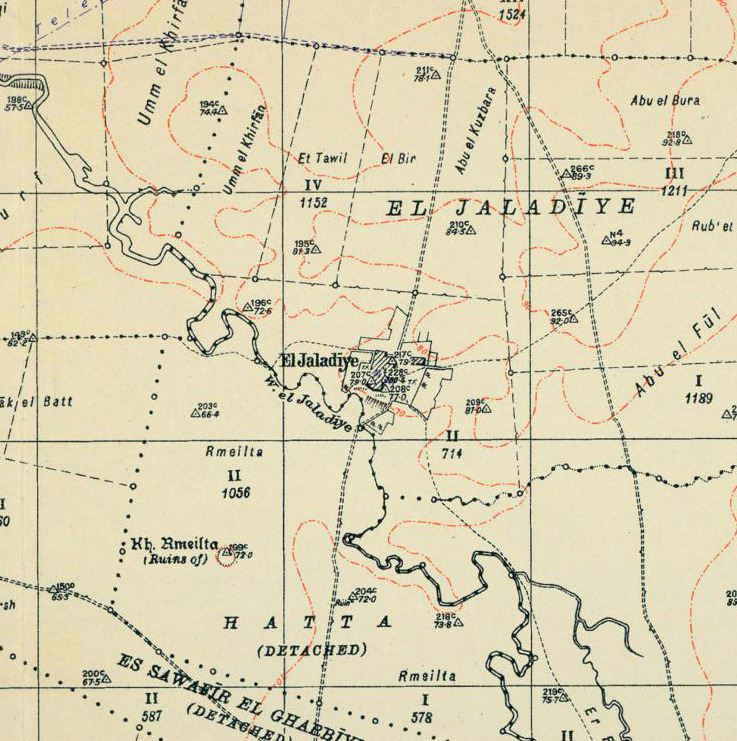
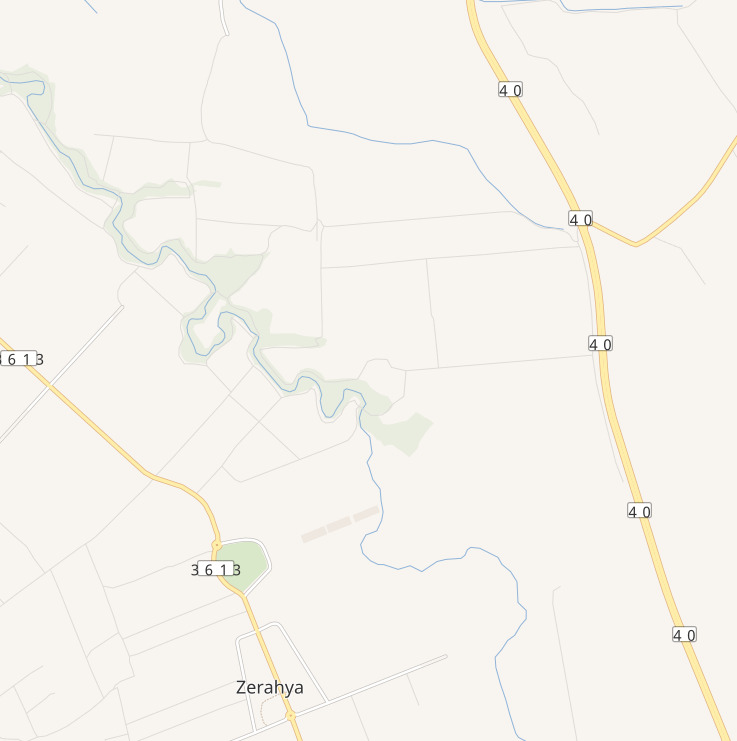
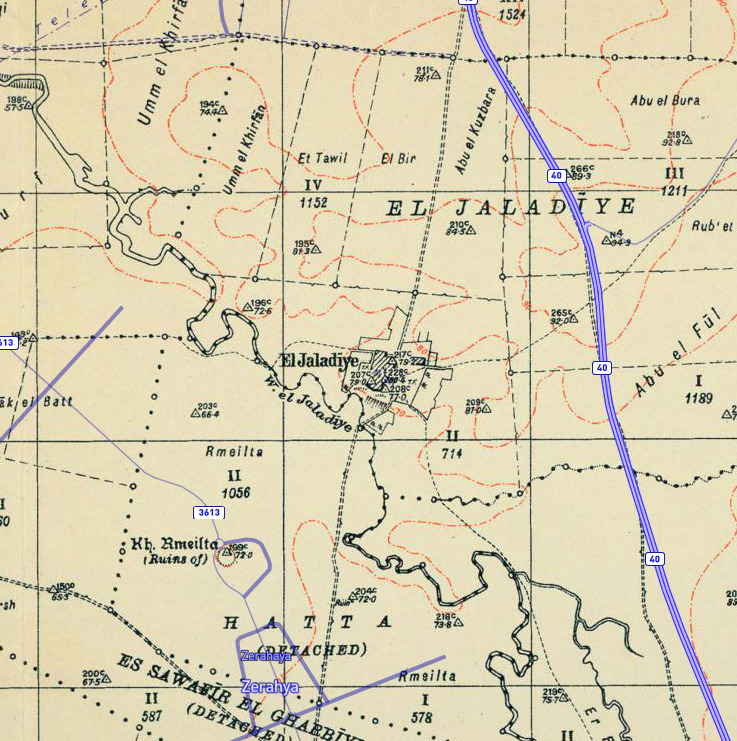
- 1870s map 1940s map modern map 1940s with modern overlay map A series of historical maps of the area around Al-Jaladiyya (click the buttons)

- Location within Mandatory Palestine
- Coordinates: 31°41′55″N 34°44′59″E
- Palestine grid: 126/122
- Geopolitical entity: Mandatory Palestine
- Subdistrict: Gaza
- Date of depopulation: Not known

Population (1945)
  - Total: 360

Al-Jaladiyya was a Palestinian Arab village in the Gaza Subdistrict. It was depopulated during the 1948 Arab-Israeli War on July 8, 1948, by the Giv'ati Brigade. It was located 34 kilometres northeast of Gaza.

The Crusades built a castle in the village. There was a school located in the village mosque (built 1890), and when it opened its doors in 1945 it had an enrollment of 43 students.

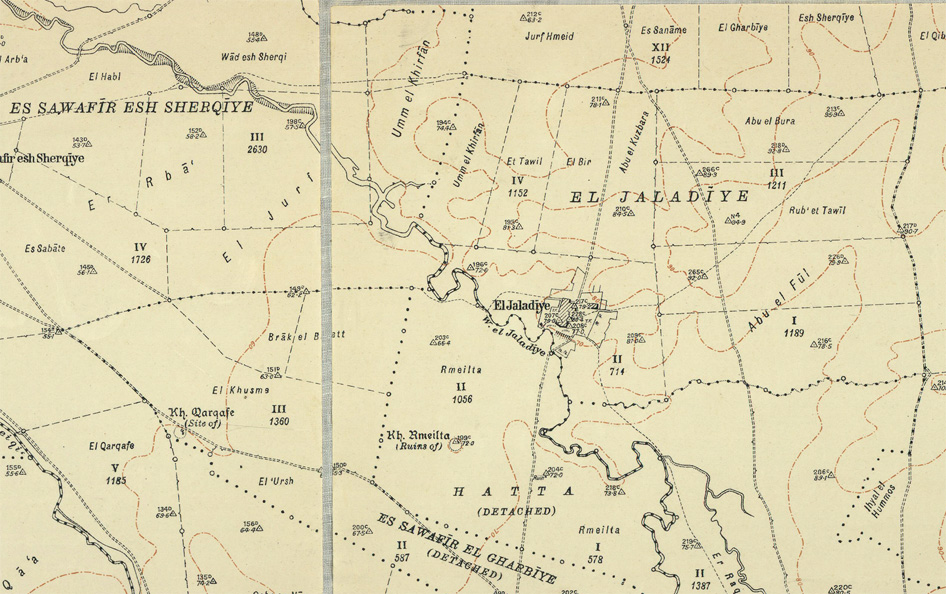
al-Jaladiyya 1930 1:20,000

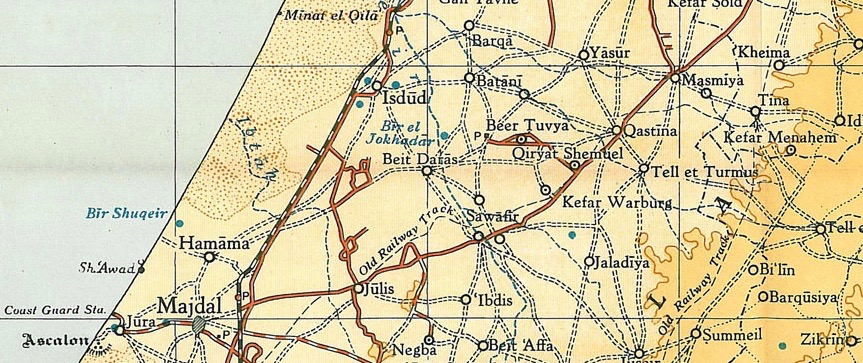
al-Jaladiya 1945 1:250,000

== Bibliography ==
- Barron, J. B., ed. (1923). Palestine: Report and General Abstracts of the Census of 1922. Government of Palestine.
- Conder, Claude Reignier; Kitchener, H. H. (1882). The Survey of Western Palestine: Memoirs of the Topography, Orography, Hydrography, and Archaeology. Vol. 2. London: Committee of the Palestine Exploration Fund. (p. 418, p.424, cited in Khalidi, 1992, p. 113)
- Department of Statistics (1945). Village Statistics, April, 1945. Government of Palestine.
- Guérin, Victor (1869). Description Géographique Historique et Archéologique de la Palestine (in French). Vol. 1: Judee, pt. 2. Paris: L'Imprimerie Nationale. (p. 85)
- Hadawi, Sami (1970). Village Statistics of 1945: A Classification of Land and Area ownership in Palestine. Palestine Liberation Organization Research Center. Archived from the original on 2018-12-08.
- Hütteroth, W.-D.; Abdulfattah, K. (1977). Historical Geography of Palestine, Transjordan and Southern Syria in the Late 16th Century. Erlanger Geographische Arbeiten, Sonderband 5. Erlangen, Germany: Vorstand der Fränkischen Geographischen Gesellschaft. ISBN 3-920405-41-2. (p. 148)
- Khalidi, Walid (1992). All That Remains: The Palestinian Villages Occupied and Depopulated by Israel in 1948. Washington D.C.: Institute for Palestine Studies. ISBN 0-88728-224-5.
- Mills, E., ed. (1932). Census of Palestine 1931. Population of Villages, Towns and Administrative Areas. Jerusalem: Government of Palestine.
- Morris, Benny (2004). The Birth of the Palestinian Refugee Problem Revisited. Cambridge University Press. ISBN 978-0-521-00967-6.
- Palmer, E. H. (1881). The Survey of Western Palestine: Arabic and English Name Lists Collected During the Survey by Lieutenants Conder and Kitchener, R. E. Transliterated and Explained by E.H. Palmer. Committee of the Palestine Exploration Fund. (p. 270 )
- Pringle, D. (1997). Secular buildings in the Crusader Kingdom of Jerusalem: an archaeological Gazetter. Cambridge University Press. ISBN 978-0-521-46010-1. (P.52)
- Robinson, E.; Smith, E. (1841). Biblical Researches in Palestine, Mount Sinai and Arabia Petraea: A Journal of Travels in the year 1838. Vol. 3. Boston: Crocker & Brewster. (Robinson and Smith, 1841, vol 3, Appendix 2, p. 118)
- Röhricht, Reinhold (1893). (RRH) Regesta regni Hierosolymitani (MXCVII-MCCXCI) (in Latin). Berlin: Libraria Academica Wageriana. (In 1160: granted by Amalric, count of Ascalon to the Holy Sepulchre: p. 93, # 356)
