= Barqusya =

Barqusya بركوسيا برقوسية
- Etymology: “variegated”
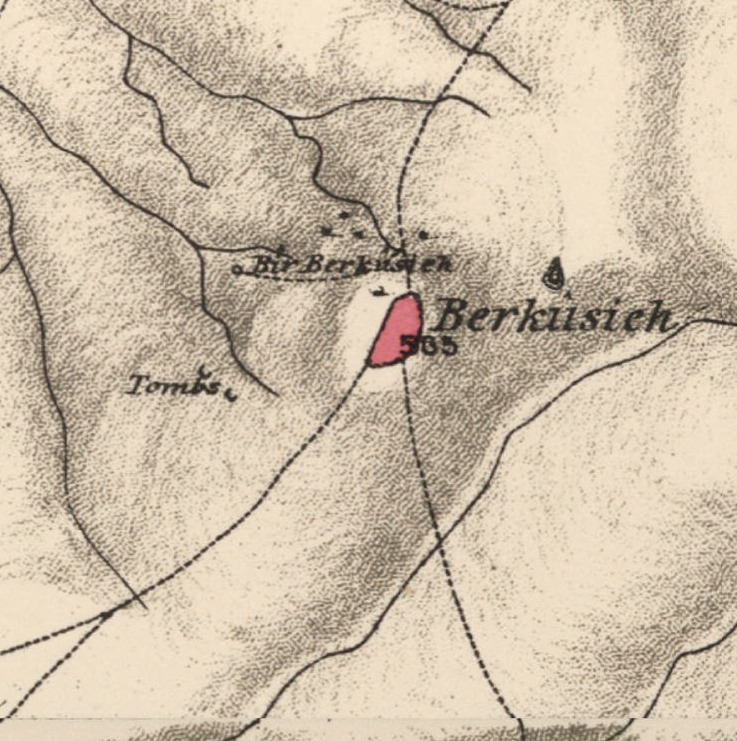
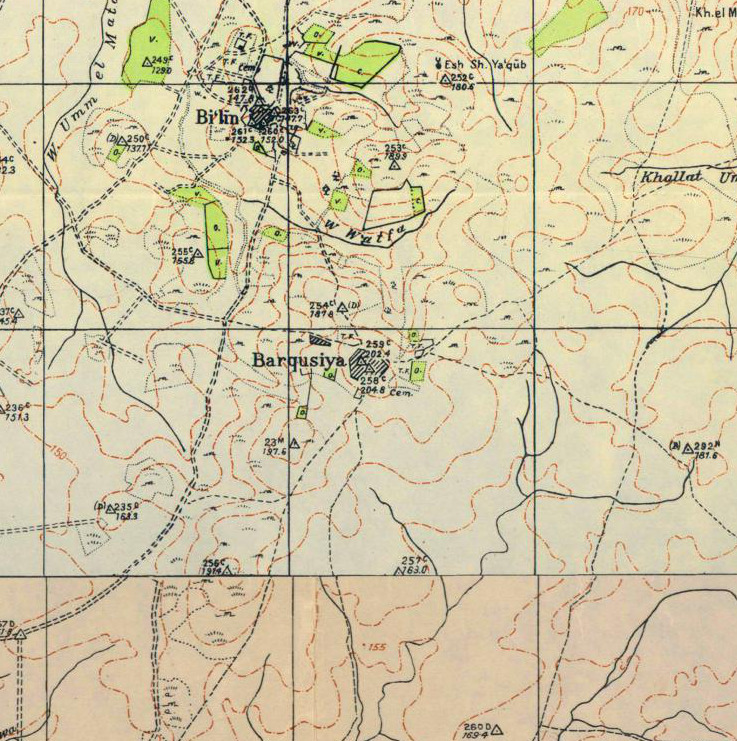
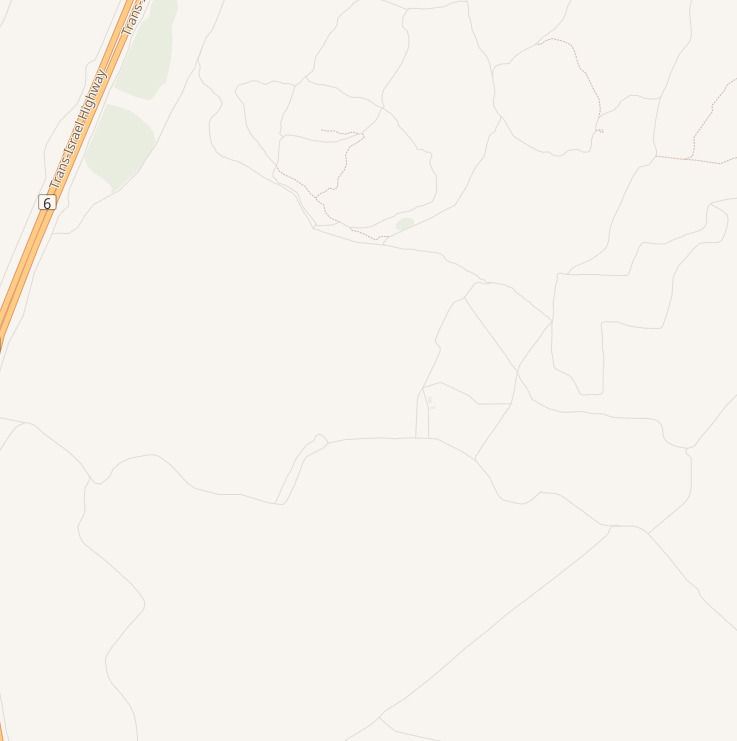
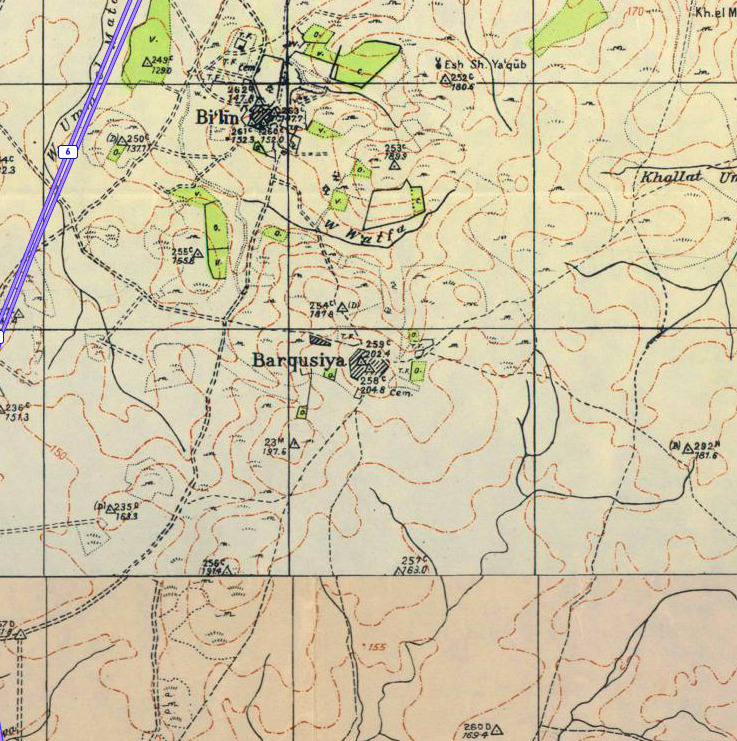
- 1870s map 1940s map modern map 1940s with modern overlay map A series of historical maps of the area around Barqusya (click the buttons)

- Location within Mandatory Palestine
- Coordinates: 31°40′46″N 34°49′24″E
- Palestine grid: 133/120
- Geopolitical entity: Mandatory Palestine
- Subdistrict: Hebron
- Date of depopulation: Not known

Area
  - Total: 3,216 dunams (3.216 km^{2}; 1.242 sq mi)

Population (1945)
  - Total: 330

Barqusya (also: Barkusya, Arabic: بركوسيا) was a Palestinian Arab village in the Hebron Subdistrict, depopulated in the 1948 Palestine War. It was located 31 km northwest of Hebron.

== History ==
In 1838, in the Ottoman era, Berkusia was noted as Muslim village in the Gaza area, and being "somewhat larger" than Bil'in.

In 1863, Victor Guérin found the village to have about 150 inhabitants. He further noted that it was situated on a low hill, with fig trees to the north.

An official Ottoman village list of about 1870 showed that Berkusja had 28 houses and a population of 72, though the population count included men, only.

In 1882 the PEF's Survey of Western Palestine (SWP) described it: "A village of moderate size, on a hill in a conspicuous position. The houses are of mud and stone. There is a fine well, resembling that of Summeil, west of the village, and rock-cut tombs to the south-west."

In 1896 the population of Berkusja was estimated to be about 171 persons.

=== British Mandate era ===
In the 1922 census of Palestine conducted by the British Mandate authorities, Barqusya had a population of 198 inhabitants, all Muslims, increasing in the 1931 census 258 inhabitants, in 53 houses.

In the 1945 statistics, it had a population of 330 Muslim inhabitants, and a land area of 3216 dunams. Of this, 28 dunams were for plantations and irrigable land, 2460 dunams were for cereals, while 31 dunams were built-up (urban) land.

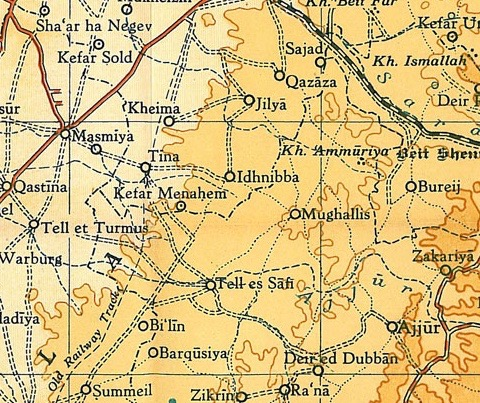
Barqusya 1945 1:250,000 (lower left quadrant)

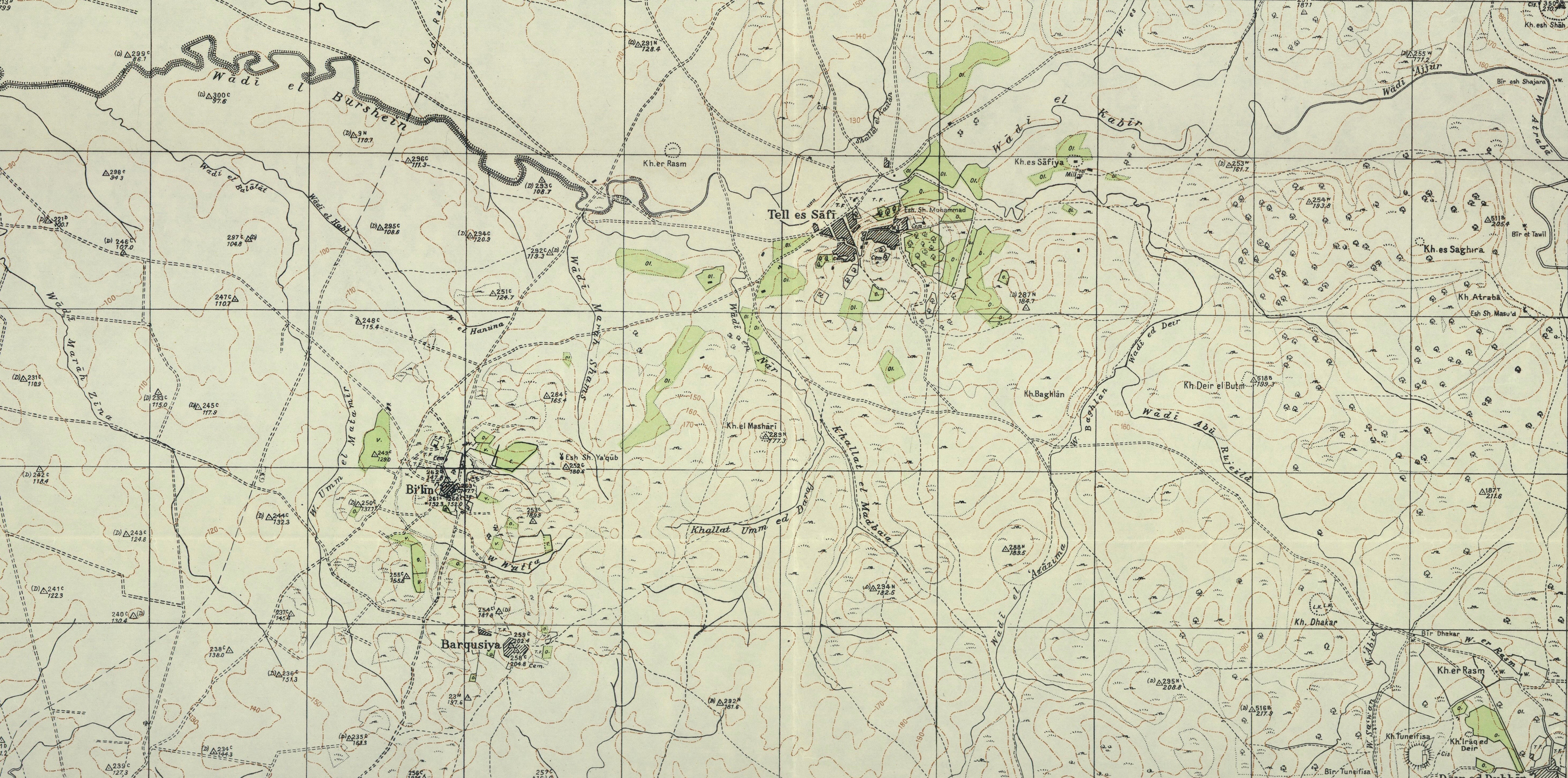
Barqusya 1948 1:20,000

=== 1948 and aftermath ===
It was depopulated during the 1948 Arab-Israeli War on July 9, 1948, as part of Operation An-Far.

In 1992 the village site was described: "No houses remain. Some graves can be seen amidst foxtail and khubbayza (mallow) plants. One of the graves has an inscribed tombstone resting on the superstructure. There are also the remnants of a well. Cactuses and a variety of trees, including palms grow on the site. The site serves as grazing grounds for Israeli farmers who also grow grapes and the fruits."

== Bibliography ==
- Barron, J.B., ed. (1923). Palestine: Report and General Abstracts of the Census of 1922. Government of Palestine.
- Conder, C.R.; Kitchener, H.H. (1882). The Survey of Western Palestine: Memoirs of the Topography, Orography, Hydrography, and Archaeology. Vol. 2. London: Committee of the Palestine Exploration Fund.
- Department of Statistics (1945). Village Statistics, April, 1945. Government of Palestine.
- Guérin, V. (1869). Description Géographique Historique et Archéologique de la Palestine. Vol 1; Judee, pt. 2. Paris, L'Imprimerie Imp.
- Hadawi, S. (1970). Village Statistics of 1945: A Classification of Land and Area ownership in Palestine. Palestine Liberation Organization Research Center.
- Hartmann, M. (1883). "Die Ortschaftenliste des Liwa Jerusalem in dem turkeschen Staatskalender dur Syrien auf das Jahr 1288 der Flucht (1871)". Zeitschrift des Deutschen Palästina-Vereins. 6: 102–149.
- Khalidi, W. (1992). All That Remains: The Palestinian Villages Occupied and Depopulated by Israel in 1948. Washington D.C.: Institute for Palestine Studies. ISBN 0-88728-224-5.
- Mills, E., ed. (1932). Census of Palestine 1931. Population of Villages, Towns and Administrative Areas. Jerusalem: Government of Palestine.
- Morris, B. (2004). The Birth of the Palestinian Refugee Problem Revisited. Cambridge University Press. ISBN 978-0-521-00967-6.
- Palmer, E.H. (1881). The Survey of Western Palestine: Arabic and English Name Lists Collected During the Survey by Lieutenants Conder and Kitchener, R. E. Transliterated and Explained by E.H. Palmer. Committee of the Palestine Exploration Fund.
- Robinson, E.; Smith, E. (1841). Biblical Researches in Palestine, Mount Sinai and Arabia Petraea: A Journal of Travels in the year 1838. Vol. 2. Boston: Crocker & Brewster.
- Robinson, E.; Smith, E. (1841). Biblical Researches in Palestine, Mount Sinai and Arabia Petraea: A Journal of Travels in the year 1838. Vol. 3. Boston: Crocker & Brewster.
- Schick, C. (1896). "Zur Einwohnerzahl des Bezirks Jerusalem". Zeitschrift des Deutschen Palästina-Vereins. 19: 120–127.
- Socin, A. (1879). "Alphabetisches Verzeichniss von Ortschaften des Paschalik Jerusalem". Zeitschrift des Deutschen Palästina-Vereins. 2: 135–163.
