= Battle of El Burj =

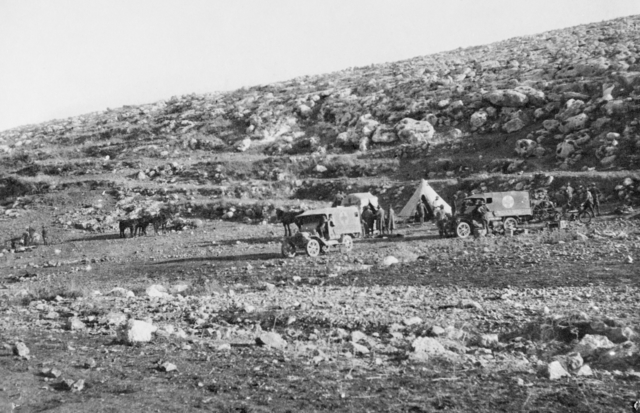
Trucks before the Battle of Tulkarm

The Battle of El Burj (1 December 1917) was an engagement fought during the Battle of Jerusalem in the Sinai and Palestine Campaign. It was fought between the forces of the Egyptian Expeditionary Force on one side and the Yildirim Army Group on the other. The Battle of Jerusalem resulted in the occupation of Jerusalem on 9 December 1917.
