= Battle of Jerusalem =

1917 British-Ottoman battle during WWI

- Part of the Middle Eastern theatre of World War I
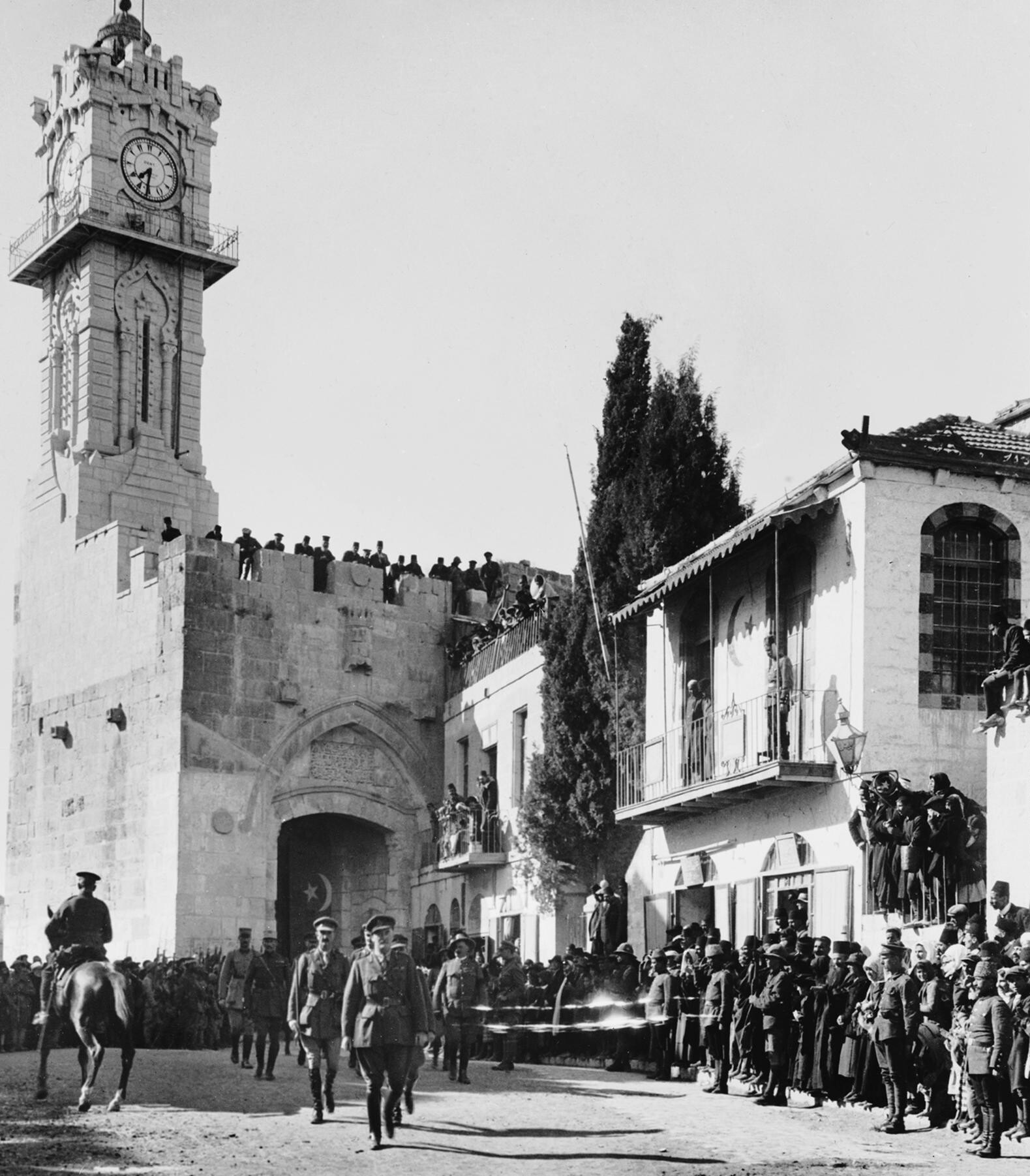
- General Allenby enters Jerusalem on foot, 11 December 1917
Date	17 November – 30 December 1917 (1 month, 1 week and 6 days)
Location	On the coast of the Mediterranean Sea north of Jaffa, into the Judean Hills and around Jerusalem 31°46′35″N 35°13′39″E
Result	Allied victory: End of the Ottoman rule in Jerusalem and Palestine
Territorial changes	Jerusalem and Palestine was taken by the British

Belligerents
Allied Powers: United Kingdom and Empire: Australia; New Zealand; Egypt; India	Central Powers: Ottoman Empire: German Empire (military officers)

Commanders and leaders
(British Empire) Edmund Allenby (British Empire) Edward Bulfin (British Empire) Philip Chetwode (Australia) Harry Chauvel	(Ottoman Empire) Djemal Pasha (Ottoman Empire) Djevad Pasha (Ottoman Empire) Ali Fuad Pasha (German Empire) Erich von Falkenhayn (German Empire) F. K. von Kressenstein

Units involved
Egyptian Expeditionary Force: XX Corps; XXI Corps; Desert Mounted Corps	Seventh Army; Eighth Army

Casualties and losses
18,000 casualties (entire campaign)	25,000 casualties (entire campaign)

The Battle of Jerusalem also known as the Fall of Jerusalem occurred during the British Empire's "Jerusalem Operations" against the Ottoman Empire, in World War I, when fighting for the city developed from 17 November, continuing after the surrender until 30 December 1917, to secure the final objective of the Southern Palestine Offensive during the Sinai and Palestine Campaign of World War I. Before Jerusalem could be secured, two battles were recognised by the British as being fought in the Hebron Hills to the north and east of the Hebron–Junction Station line. These were the Battle of Nebi Samwill from 17 to 24 November and the Defence of Jerusalem from 26 to 30 December 1917. They also recognised within these Jerusalem Operations, the successful second attempt on 21 and 22 December 1917 to advance across the Nahr el Auja, as the Battle of Jaffa, although Jaffa had been occupied as a consequence of the Battle of Mughar Ridge on 16 November.

This series of battles was successfully fought by the British Empire's XX Corps, XXI Corps, and the Desert Mounted Corps against strong opposition from the Yildirim Army Group's Seventh Army in Hebron Hills and the Eighth Army north of Jaffa on the Mediterranean coast. The loss of Jaffa and Jerusalem, together with the loss of 50 mi (80 km) of territory during the Egyptian Expeditionary Force (EEF) advance from Gaza, after the capture of Beersheba, Gaza, Hareira and Sheria, Tel el Khuweilfe and the Battle of Mughar Ridge, constituted a grave setback for the Ottoman Army and the Ottoman Empire.

As a result of these victories, the British Empire forces captured Jerusalem and established a new strategically strong fortified line. This line ran from well to the north of Jaffa on the maritime plain, across the Hebron Hills to Bireh north of Jerusalem, and continued eastwards of the Mount of Olives. With the capture of the road from Be'e Elsabe' (Beersheba) to Jerusalem via Hebron and Bethlehem, together with substantial Ottoman territory south of Jerusalem, the city was secured. On 11 December, General Edmund Allenby entered the Old City on foot through the Jaffa Gate instead of horse or vehicles to show respect for the holy city. He was the first Christian in many centuries to control Jerusalem, a city held holy by three great religions. The prime minister of the United Kingdom, David Lloyd George, described the capture as "a Christmas present for the British people". The battle was a great morale boost for the British Empire.

== Background ==
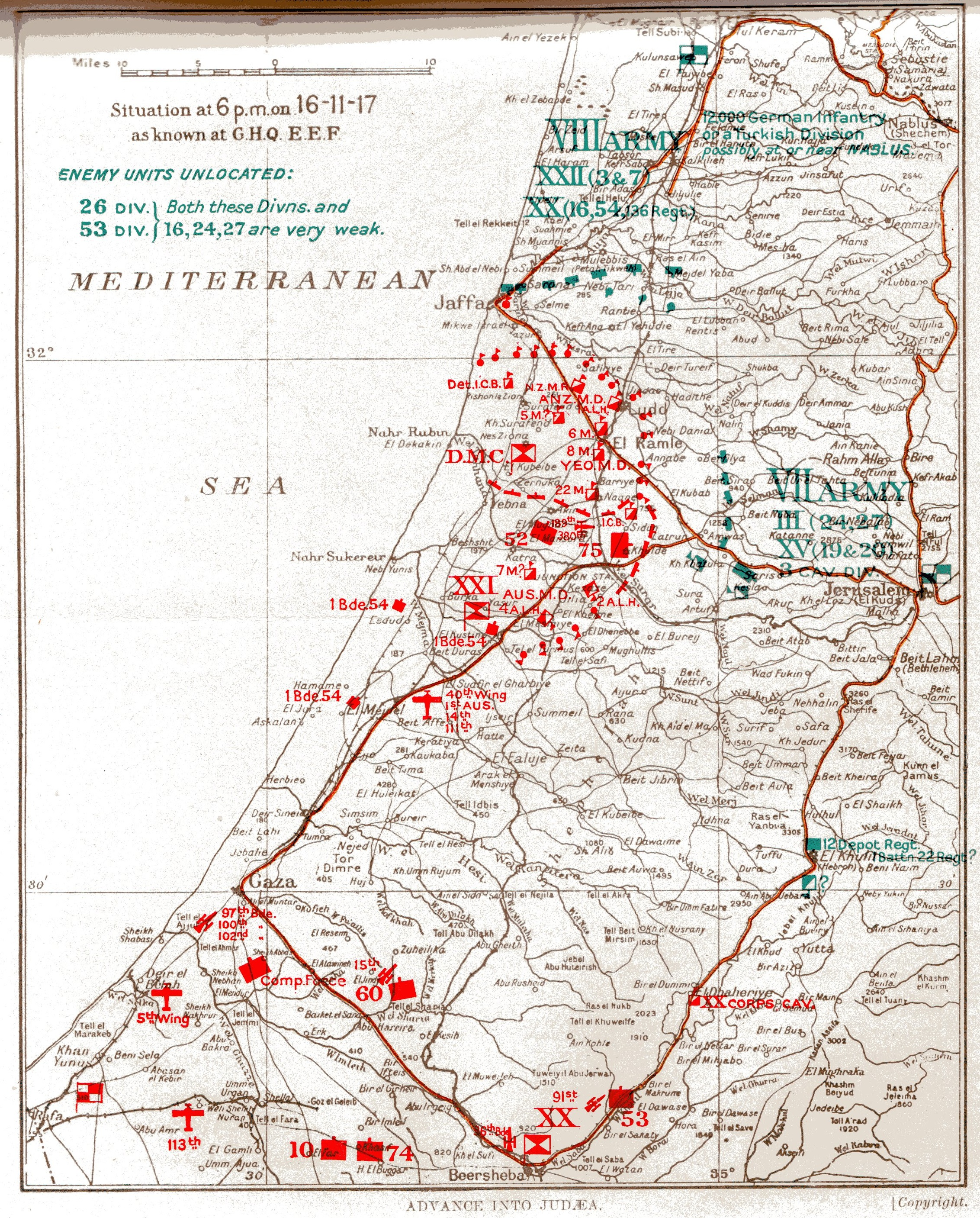
Situation at 18:00 on 16 November 1917 as known to GHQ EEF

British General Edmund Allenby, Commander-in-Chief of the Egyptian Expeditionary Force (EEF), had won a decisive victory against the German General Erich von Falkenhayn, commander of Ottoman forces in Palestine, at the Battle of Mughar Ridge on 13 November. The British Empire victory forced von Falkenhayn to withdraw his Seventh and Eighth Armies (commanded by Fevzi Pasha and Kress von Kressenstein respectively) and move his headquarters from Jerusalem to Nablus on 14 November. As the Ottoman III Corps (Seventh Army) reached Jerusalem via the Hebron road after its defeat at Beersheba, it was ordered to develop defences around Jerusalem. This corps held the city while the XX Corps retreated from Junction Station into the Hebron Hills towards Jerusalem. As they retired the XX Corps left strong rearguards to stop or slow the British advance. Time was needed to construct defences and for reorganisation of the depleted and disorganised Seventh Army. When they arrived in the city XX Corps took over responsibility for Jerusalem's defences, while III Corps continued to move northwards from Jerusalem along the Nablus road.

The British War Cabinet had cautioned Allenby not to commit to any operations that might not be sustainable in the long term if the strength of British forces in the area could not be maintained. Their concerns were possibly linked to a peace proposal published on 8 November by the new Russian Bolshevik government between Russia and Germany. The document, scheduled to be signed on 3 March 1918, would constitute a separate peace treaty and result in the withdrawal of all Russian troops from the war. All German forces on the eastern front could then turn their attention to fighting British and French forces elsewhere.

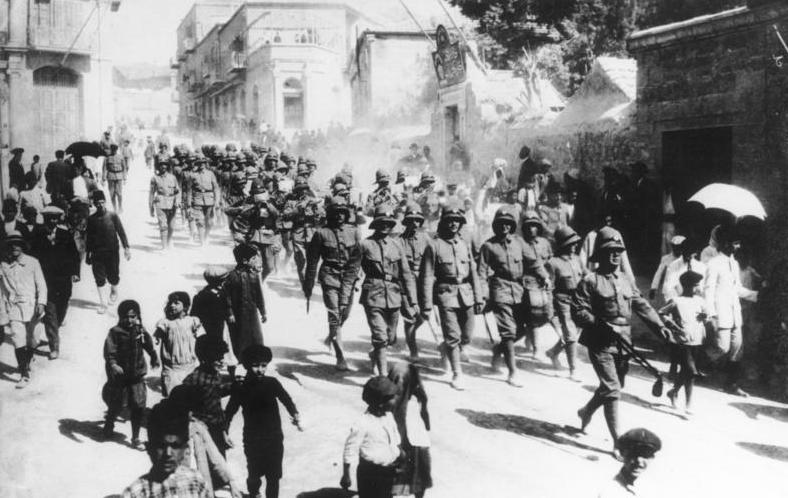
German soldiers in Jerusalem in 1914

Allenby was aware of the lack of accurate maps of the Hebron Hills and that the history of previous campaigns in the region gave clear warnings against hasty or lightly supported assaults on the strong western ramparts. His front-line forces had been fighting and advancing for an extended period fighting many miles from their bases and were tired and depleted. Now 35 mi (56 km) from the railhead at Deir el Belah, Allenby's troops did not have a line of defensive entrenchments behind which they could stop a concerted push by these two Ottoman armies. Such a counterattack could well see them driven back to Gaza and Beersheba. (Note: This problem began to be addressed on 24 November as the advance into the Judean Hills ground to a halt in front of Nebi Samwil. On that day the first stage of operations officially known by the British as the Battle of Jaffa (even though Jaffa had been captured several days earlier, on 16 November 1917) began with the Anzac Mounted Division (commanded by Major General E. W. C. Chaytor) and the 54th (East Anglian) Division (commanded by Major General S. W. Hare) being sent north of Jaffa to attack and push back Kress von Kressenstein's Ottoman 8th Army. These Ottoman forces were pushed back northwards behind the Nahr el Auja enabling the construction of a new line of defences by the EEF to begin on the Mediterranean coast. [Bruce 2002, p. 155] See also Battle of Mughar Ridge for a description of the operations which resulted in the capture of Jaffa.)

Allenby reviewed the threat of counterattack and his supply situation and decided that a force large enough to attack into the Hebron Hills and a separate force to operate on the maritime plain could be maintained far from base. He decided to quickly attack Fevzi Pasha's Ottoman 7th Army in the Hebron Hills with the hope of capturing Jerusalem. This would keep pressure on this army in the hope of denying them time to complete their reorganisation, dig deep trenches or worst of all, counterattack.

== Prelude ==
=== British Empire supply lines ===
The planned advance into the Hebron Hills would rely heavily on the ability of the lines of communications to keep the front line troops supplied with food, water and ammunition. These were already operating at considerable distances from the railhead and base areas, and as a result the advance was forced to pause on 17 November to enable supplies to be brought forward by columns under corps control, which had been sent back to railhead for rations and supplies.

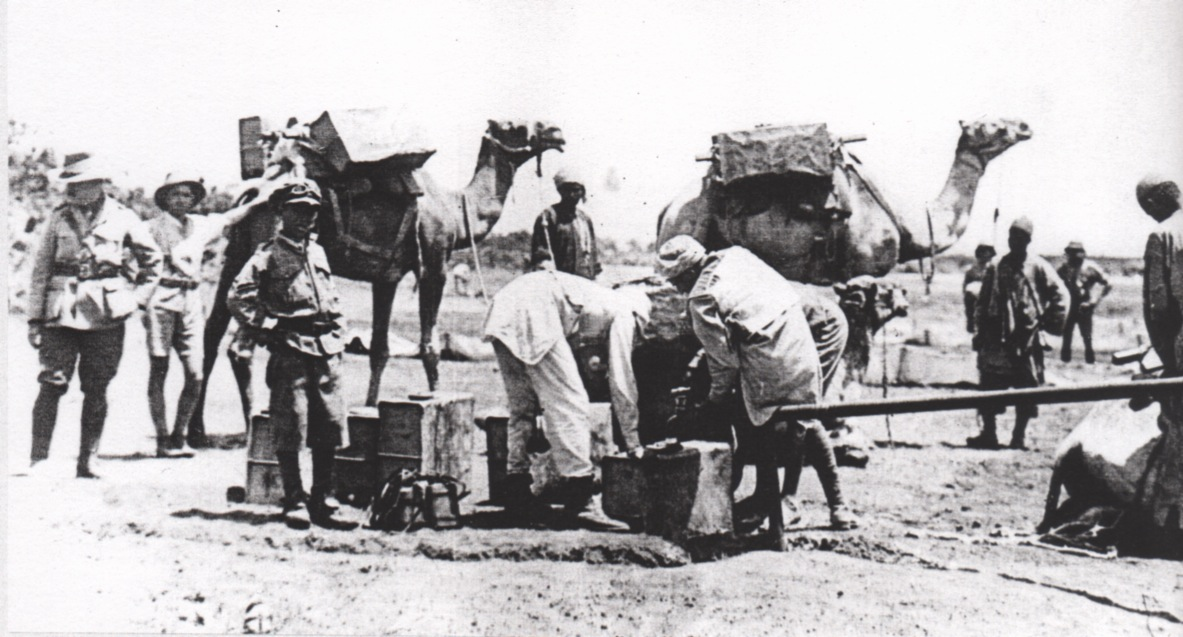
Filling fantasies and loading them onto camels near Jaffa

Transporting supplies forward from railhead was a slow but continuous 24-hour-a-day business, because the Ottoman Army had destroyed as much of their infrastructure as they could during their retreat. Only lorries of the British Army Service Corps (ASC) Motor Transport companies and camels of the Egyptian Camel Transport Corps could use the single, narrow, poorly metalled road from Gaza to Junction Station. Between Gaza and Beit Hanun the road was unsealed and deep in sand making it difficult for lorries to proceed, even with a light load of one ton. Supplies were also shipped by sea and landed at Wadi Sukereir, and later at Jaffa. Lack of infrastructure at Jaffa meant all supplies brought via ship had to be cross-loaded onto surf boats, which then had to be unloaded on the beaches. Such operations were heavily dependent on the weather, so the amount of supplies transported by sea was limited.

Feeding an army dependent on horses was a huge task. The marching ration of a horse was 9.5 lb (4.3 kg) of grain a day, which, when multiplied by the 25,000 horses in the Desert Mounted Corps, worked out to over 100 tons of grain a day. One hundred lorries would be needed for the horses as well as transportation for rations required by the troops in the front line.

All available lorries and camels were organised in convoys moving north from the railhead along the Gaza to Junction Station road from Deir el Belah to El Mejdel and then on to Julis, where the 26 and 27 Depot Unit of Supply (DUS) set up advanced supply dumps to serve the Australian Mounted Division and the Anzac Mounted Division. From these dumps the Transport Sections of 5 Company (New Zealand Army Service Corps) and the 32nd, 33rd, and 34th Companies (Australian Army Service Corps) served the Anzac Mounted Division, and the 35th, 36th, and 37th Companies served the Australian Mounted Division. These companies of horse- and mule-drawn wagons could operate to serve their brigades during brigade operations and when required could form into divisional trains during divisional operations. A forward lorry-head was established at Ramleh, where the loads were dumped and the Transport Companies distributed the supplies to the forward units. Members of the Egyptian Labour Corps (as second drivers) worked alongside the Australian Army Service Corps transporting, loading, and unloading the General Service and Limber wagons of supplies ordered by the brigades. The huge endeavour was administered by the supply sections in a similar fashion to the divisional ammunition columns which also worked to supply ammunition to the fighting units in a similarly continuous operation.

=== Advance by the Desert Mounted Corps continues ===
On 15 November the commander of Desert Mounted Corps, Lieutenant General Sir Harry Chauvel, issued orders for the Yeomanry Mounted Division (Major General G. de S. Barrow) and the Anzac Mounted Division (Major General E. W. C. Chaytor) to continue the advance on Ramleh and Lud about 5 mi (8.0 km) from Junction Station. On the same day the Yeomanry Mounted Division reached the Jerusalem road after a cavalry charge by the 6th Mounted Brigade (Brigadier General C. A. C. Godwin) at Abu Shusheh. This charge has been described as even more daring than that at Mughar Ridge, owing to the rocky nature of the ground over which the horsemen attacked. The New Zealand Mounted Rifles Brigade (Brigadier General W. Meldrum) secured the left flank of the EEF by occupying Jaffa on 16 November. This city was captured as a result of the victory at Ayun Kara two days earlier, which forced the Ottoman Eighth Army to withdraw over the Nahr el Auja, which enters the sea 4 mi (6.4 km) north-north-east of Jaffa. The Eighth Army's withdrawal placed them to the north of the Ottoman Seventh Army and opened up that army's right flank to attack. As a result, the Seventh Army was forced to move further away from the coastal sector into the Hebron Hills. Here, in front of Jerusalem, Ottoman infantry units created a defensive screen.

== Battle ==
=== Advance into the Hebron Hills begins ===
Despite continued pressure by the EEF, the two opposing forces were now operating in terrain which favoured defence. In addition to rearguards left by the Ottoman Seventh Army's XX Corps as it retired into the hills, the Seventh Army had managed to establish a line of mainly single trenches running south and south-west on a series of heights up to 4 mi (6.4 km) from Jerusalem, supported by well-sited redoubts. Aerial reconnaissance on 17 November found the road north from Jerusalem to Nablus crowded with refugees.

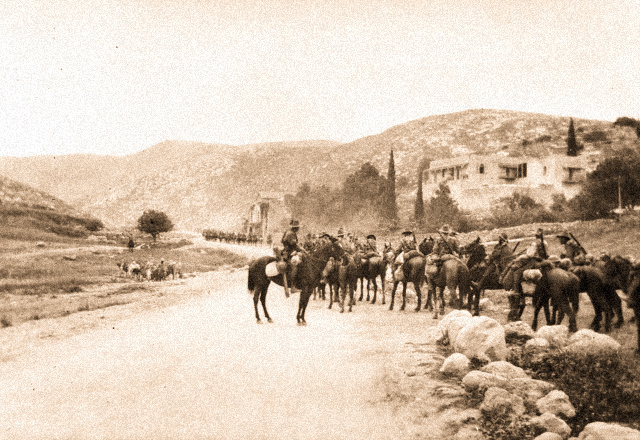
The 4th Light Horse Regiment entering mountain passes near Latron

On 18 November, while Allenby was at the British XXI Corps headquarters at El Kastine, the decision was made to closely follow the Ottoman Seventh Army into the Hebron Hills. This was in the hope of ensuring that the Ottoman army had little time to regroup or construct defences which, given more time, might prove impregnable.

Allenby's plan was to avoid fighting in or near Jerusalem but to cut all road access to the city and force the Ottoman Army to evacuate it. He ordered two infantry divisions; the 52nd (Lowland) (Major General J. Hill) and the 75th Division (Major General P. C. Palin), and two mounted divisions; the Yeomanry and the Australian Mounted Divisions to begin the advance. (Note: The names of infantry divisions, brigades and battalions and some other units have, in many cases, been changed so they no longer reflect the names of these units as they appear in most of the sources quoted.) They were to move eastwards from Latron, which had been captured on 16 November, in the same direction as the Jaffa to Jerusalem road.

Infantry from the 75th Division was to move up the main road despite several demolitions being carried out by the retiring Ottomans on this good metalled road running east to west through Amwas. On the left and to the north of the 75th Division, infantry from the 52nd (Lowland) Division was to make its way up minor roads or tracks from Ludd towards Jerusalem. And further north on the left of the 52nd (Lowland) Division, the Yeomanry Mounted Division was to move north and north east. Their aim was to cut the Ottoman Seventh Army's lines of communication at Bireh, 8 mi (13 km) north of Jerusalem on the Jerusalem to Nablus road.

The Yeomanry Mounted Division's 6th, 8th and 22nd brigades, with 20th Brigade, Royal Horse Artillery (13 pounders) were to move northwards via the old Roman road from Ludd to Ramallah through Berfilya and Beit Ur el Tahta towards Bireh. At the same time the 53rd (Welsh) Division (Major General S. F. Mott) was to advance northwards along the Beersheba to Jerusalem road to take Hebron and Bethlehem before moving eastwards to secure the road from Jerusalem to Jericho.

The 75th Division with the Australian and Yeomanry Mounted Divisions began their entry into the Hebron Hills on 18 November. (Note: While most of the fighting done by the mounted divisions in this region was on foot, one quarter of the yeomanry and light horsemen were holding the horses, a brigade was equivalent in rifle strength to an infantry battalion. [Preston 1921 p. 168])

[A]ll the armies that have sought to take Jerusalem have passed this way, save only that of Joshua. Philistine and Hittite, Babylonian and Assyrian, Egyptian and Roman and Greek, Frankish Knights of the Cross, all have passed this way, and all have watered the hill of Amwas with their blood.

— R. M. P. Preston

The first objective was to capture and secure the heights on either side of the main Jaffa to Jerusalem road at Amwas, so the 75th Division could advance up the road and into the Hebron Hills. Moving up the railway line in the Wadi Surar on the right of infantry in the 75th Division was the Anzac Mounted Division's 2nd Light Horse Brigade, which was temporarily attached to the Australian Mounted Division. The brigade's 9th Light Horse Regiment carried out a turning movement up the Wadi es Selman north of Amwas to reach the village of Yalo 2 mi (3.2 km) to the east. After this successful operation the Australian Mounted Division withdrew to rest camp at the mouth of the Nahr Sukereir. Taking over the advance on the morning of 19 November infantry from the 75th Division found Amwas evacuated, but the advance guard of the Yeomanry Mounted Division's 8th Mounted Brigade, the 3rd County of London Yeomanry struggled to within 2 mi (3.2 km) of Beit Ur el Tahta that night, while the 22nd Mounted Brigade reached Shilta.

==== 75th Division ====
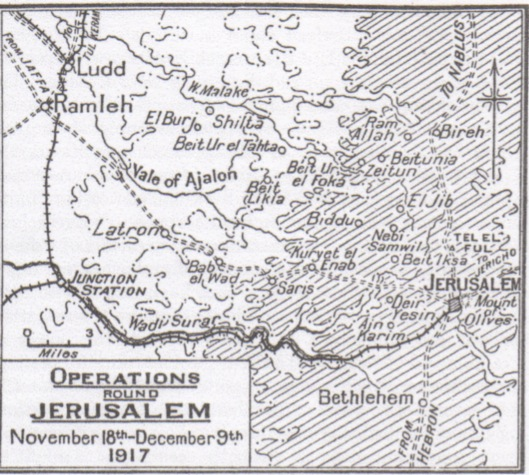
Map 14 Jerusalem operations – 18 November to 9 December 1917

Just 2 mi (3.2 km) after the main road to Jerusalem entered the hills, it ran through the easily defended pass of Bab el-Wad. On 19 November the 75th Division infantry moved up this road; their 232nd Brigade had left Abu Shushe at 07:30 to occupy the deserted town of Amwas and by 11:00 the Indian 58th Vaughan's Rifles (Frontier Force) of 234th Brigade had fought their way up to reach the heights of Bab el Wad.

After Bab el Wad, the road wound to Jerusalem through deep, narrow valleys, over steep spurs, and around the shoulders of rocky hills. There were other ways through the hills, but they were a tangle of unmapped, rough and rocky hill tracks and pathways—often little more than donkey tracks—which made movement by infantry, dismounted cavalry, and artillery very difficult. The rough tracks meandered through narrow valleys and over distorted piles of razor-backed ridges, which were broken by groups of cone-shaped hills and successive shelves of rock jutting out from every hillside at intervals of a few yards. It was virtually impossible for advances to the north or south of the main road to be supported by artillery. In heavy rain and cold, wet and muddy conditions, it was found to be impossible to deploy the 75th Division's guns off the road. These guns had been brought forward by teams of up to eight horses to a gun the day before.

All military activities were made even more difficult by the winter conditions; the ground was slippery and dense black clouds brought early darkness which cut visibility. No advance was possible after 17:00, by which time the foremost piquet was within half a mile of the village of Saris. The forward infantry units of the 75th Division had advanced 10 mi (16 km) since morning. They bivouacked astride the road, under fire from Ottoman snipers.

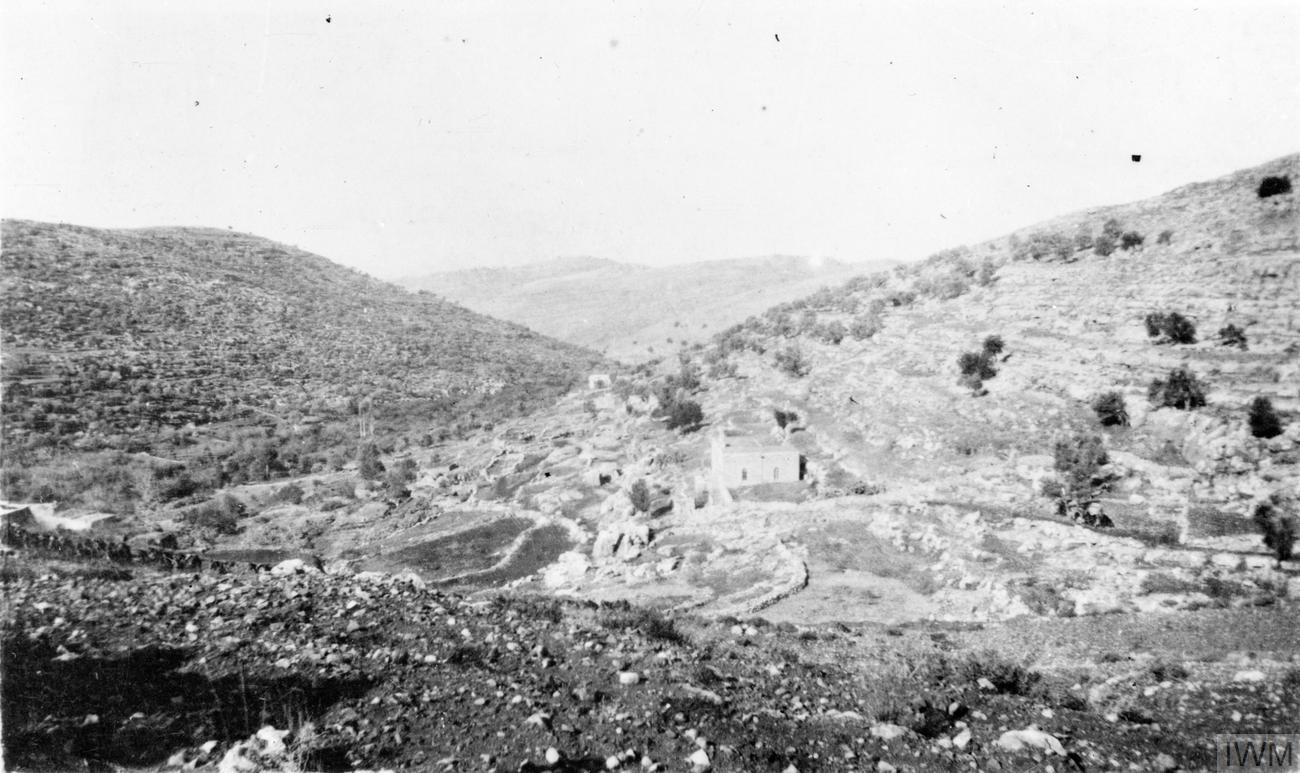
Typical Hebron Hills landscape in 1917

During the evening of 19 November, a thunderstorm followed by a drenching downpour broke over the opposing armies. In a few hours every wadi in the foothills and on the plain was in flood. The black soil plain, hard and firm during summer, became in these winter conditions sticky and heavy for marching and almost impassable for wheeled vehicles. The temperature, which had been hot during the day and pleasant at night, dropped rapidly to become piercingly cold. The infantrymen had been marching light in their summer uniform of twill shorts and tunics. With only one blanket (and/or a greatcoat), this gear gave little protection from the driving rain and bitter chill.

In these conditions the Ottoman forces encountered on the road were the rearguards von Falkenhayn had ordered XX Corps to establish as it retired back to defend Jerusalem. Established on commanding ridges, these rearguards were made up of small groups dug in on the hills. Each of these successive positions were attacked by Indian and Gurkha troops who outmanoeuvred the defenders.

==== Positions of Ottoman armies ====
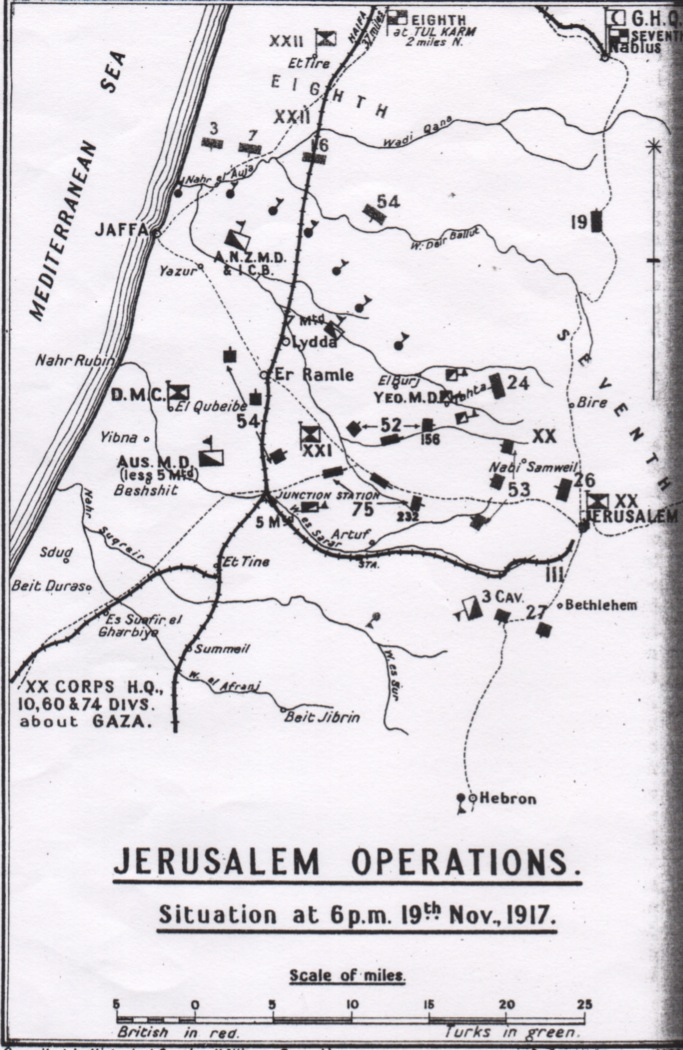
Jerusalem Operations. Situation at 18:00 19 November 1917

In addition to the Nahr Sukrerir line stretching to Bayt Jibrin together with Summeil and El Tineh (where the Battle of Mughar Ridge was fought), the positions of the EEF and the Ottoman armies on the evening of 19 November 1917 are shown on this sketch map.

With its headquarters at Nablus, the Seventh Ottoman Army was deployed to defend Jerusalem; its left flank covered by the III Corps' 3rd Cavalry Division. Infantry from the 27th Division was astride the Hebron to Jerusalem road. Infantry from the XX Corps' 53rd Division held a line in front of Nebi Samweil, with infantry from the 26th Division in reserve. Infantry defending Bireh on the Jerusalem to Nablus road were from the 24th Division, with infantry from the 19th Division on the road halfway between Bireh and Nablus. The Ottoman Eighth Army, with its headquarters at Tul Karm, deployed its XXII Corps on the Nahr el Auja. Stretching from the coast the 3rd, 7th, and 16th Divisions were virtually in line with British infantry from the 54th (East Anglian) Division further inland.

==== Attempts to cut the Nablus road ====
The leading infantry brigade of 52nd (Lowland) Division, which had reached Beit Likia on 19 November by moving along a track north of the main road, was held up towards Kuryet el Enab by a very determined and formidable Ottoman rearguard armed with machine guns at Kustal and Beit Dukka. The Ottoman positions were strongly defended and the 52nd (Lowland) Division could not advance until a mist, rolled down just before dark on 21 November, giving the 75th Division the opportunity to rapidly deploy, climb the ridge, and defeat the Ottoman force with bayonets. That night, the troops ate their iron rations (carried by the men as emergency rations), and some found shelter from the miserable conditions in a large monastery and sanatorium. The night was cold with heavy rain, and those without shelter suffered severely. No supplies arrived till noon the following day owing to congestion on the narrow tracks.

Infantry from the 52nd (Lowland) Division moved into position coming up in between the 75th Division on its right and the Yeomanry Mounted Division on its left. The Yeomanry Mounted Division, advancing towards Beit Ur el Foka and Bireh on the Nablus road 10 mi (16 km) north of Jerusalem was to converge with infantry in the 75th Division at Bireh and cut the Nablus to Jerusalem road. Resistance at Saris appeared to be weakening, by 11:00 progress continued to be slow. Saris was eventually won during the afternoon of 21 November.

Operating in the hills to the north of the infantry divisions, the Yeomanry Mounted Division continued to struggle to advance. They moved across the roughest and bleakest areas of the Hebron Hills toward Beit Ur el Tahta in a single-file column nearly 6 mi (9.7 km) long. At 11:30 on 21 November the leading regiment, the Dorset Yeomanry descended from the hills on which Beit Ur el Foqa stands and found Ottoman units holding the western rim of the Zeitun Ridge above them. This ridge, to the west of Bireh, was held by 3,000 Ottoman troops (the whole of the 3rd Ottoman Cavalry Division and half of the 24th Division) with several artillery batteries. Although the dismounted Yeomanry were able to briefly take the ridge, they were soon forced off. Heavy rainfall and cold weather severely tested both men and animals while they made several unsuccessful attempts to force their way up the steep, rocky sides of the ridge. But early in the afternoon more Ottoman reinforcements arrived from the north and counterattacked strongly. They forced the Yeomanry Mounted Division back into the deep ravine on the west side of the ridge. That night the Berkshire Yeomanry lay out on the ridge facing Ottoman units at close quarters in torrential rain, their horses in the deep valley below. The situation soon became serious and orders were given for all three brigades to break off and retire to Beit Ur el Foqa and a successful withdrawal was carried out after dark. No aerial support was possible, probably due to the weather, until No. 1 Squadron Australian Flying Corps carried out aerial bombing on Bireh village on 22 and 24 November.

=== 21–24 November: Battle of Nebi Samwil ===
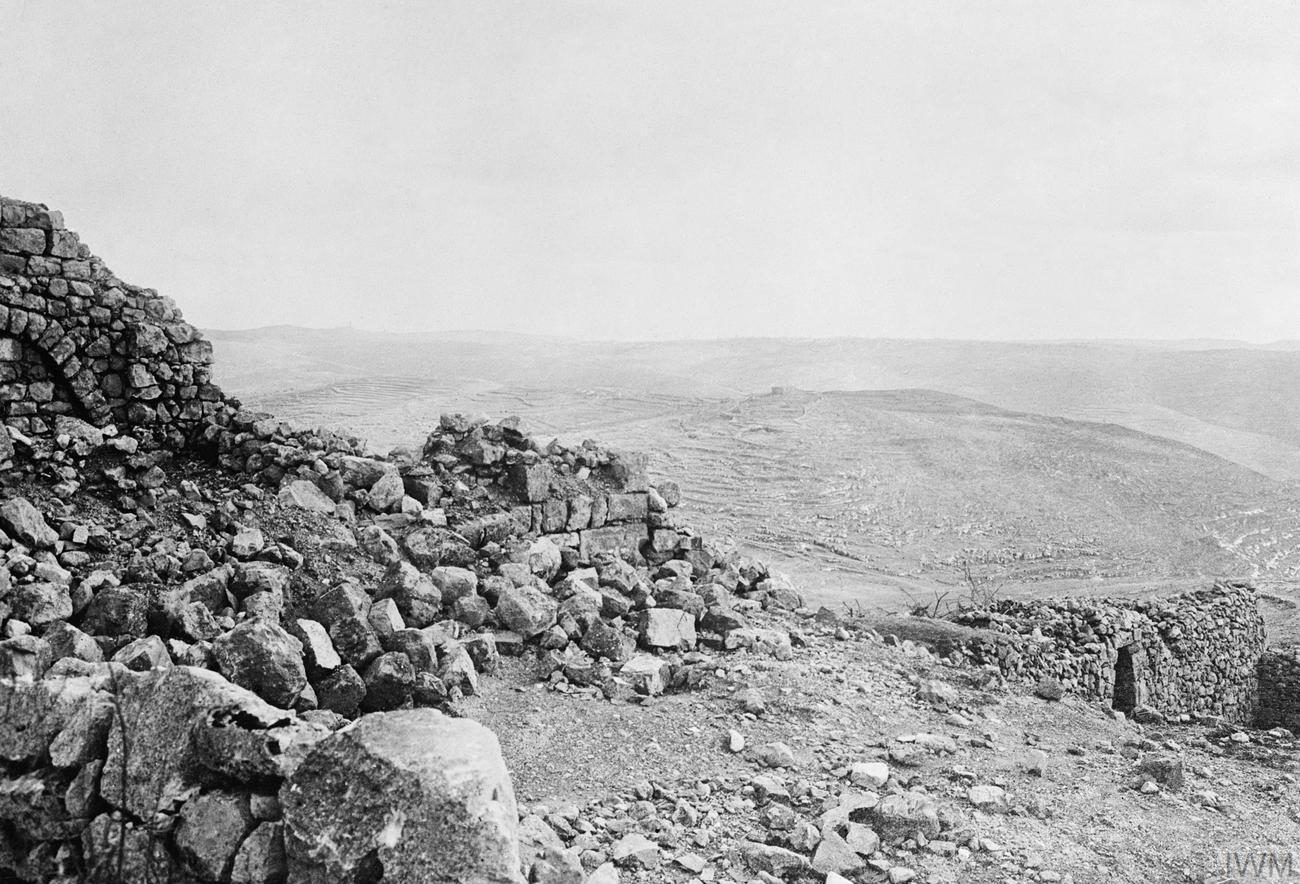
The summit of Nebi Samwil

The Battle of Nebi Samuel has officially been identified by the British as beginning on 17 November and finishing on 24 November 1917. But until 21 November infantry from the 75th Division was still continuing its advance towards Bireh. On that day, as the infantry division turned north east cutting across the front of the 52nd (Lowland) Division, their progress was blocked at Biddu by Ottoman forces entrenched on the height of Nebi Samuel, dominating Jerusalem and its defences. This hill, the traditional site of the tomb of the Prophet Samuel, was taken late in the evening by the 234th Brigade, 75th Division, after fierce fighting. The 52nd (Lowland) Division had taken the more difficult line, while the 75th Division was directed to the south western approaches. Several counterattacks by Ottoman forces during the following days failed. In close fighting, Ottoman soldiers strongly counterattacked, reaching the gates of the mosque before Gurkha infantry fought them off. Fevzi's Seventh Army had fought Allenby's two infantry divisions to a standstill.

The attacks by three British divisions had been held by three Ottoman divisions; the British suffering well over 2,000 casualties. There are no estimates of Ottoman casualties. A sketch map showing the positions of the armies on 28 November (see 'Ottoman counterattacks 1800 28 November 1917' map below) indicates the area about Nebi Samwil was still closely contested ground by the British 60th (London) Division and the Ottoman 53rd Division and the vital road link from Jerusalem to Nablus was still in Ottoman hands. (Note: Grainger claims this battle was an expensive British defeat: "When an army counts its own casualties and ignores those of its enemy, this is a clear indication of its defeat. The Turks had won a most convincing defensive victory." [Grainger 2006, p. 193])

On 24 November Allenby ordered the relief of the three divisions of the EEF's XXI Corps and Desert Mounted Corps. In order to move such large formations a pause was unavoidable and so the attack was discontinued, but von Falkenhayn and his Ottoman Army took notice of the temporary cessation of hostilities.

=== 24 November: First attack across the Nahr el Auja ===
The advance by two infantry and one mounted division into the Hebron Hills towards Jerusalem was suspended in the area of Nebi Samwil on 24 November. On the same day infantry from the 54th (East Anglian) Division and the Anzac Mounted Division began their attack across the Nahr el Auja on the Mediterranean coast to the north of Jaffa. The only mounted brigade available was the New Zealand Mounted Rifles Brigade, which had been on garrison duty in the occupied city of Jaffa since 16 November. On the northern bank the river was defended by the 3rd and 7th Divisions of the Ottoman Eighth Army.

The New Zealand Mounted Rifles Brigade advanced across the river and established two bridgeheads. The first was across the bridge on the main road near Khirbet Hadrah (also referred to as Khurbet Hadra) and the second was at Sheik Muanis, near the mouth of the river. These operations had two aims – to gain territory and discourage the Ottoman Eighth Army from transferring troops into the Hebron Hills to reinforce the Seventh Army. After successful actions by the New Zealand Mounted Brigade, two infantry battalions of the 54th (East Anglian) Division held these two bridgeheads on the northern bank until they were attacked by overwhelming forces on 25 November. The 3rd and 7th Divisions of the Ottoman Eighth Army had driven in the bridgeheads and restored the tactical situation.

Deep and fast-flowing, the el Auja river could not be crossed except at known and well-established places, so at 01:00 on 24 November the Canterbury Mounted Rifles Regiment crossed at the ford on the beach. They moved at a gallop and quickly seized the hills which overlooked the ford, capturing the village of Sheikh Muannis (which gave its name to the ford), but the Ottoman cavalry garrison escaped. The Wellington Mounted Rifles Regiment came up to the Canterbury Regiment and then advanced eastwards to Khurbet Hadrah, which commanded the bridge on the main road. They captured 29 prisoners, one machine gun, and one British Lewis gun. Two infantry companies of the Essex Regiment, 161st (Essex) Brigade, 54th (East Anglian) Division crossed the Hadrah bridge and occupied the village. The 4th and 11th Squadrons of the Auckland Mounted Rifle Regiment with the 2nd Squadron of the Wellington Mounted Rifle Regiment, were placed at the bridge and in the village of Sheikh Muannis in front of the infantry posts. The Canterbury Mounted Rifles Regiment's 1st Squadron took up a post on the sea beach; each of these squadrons had two machine guns to strengthen them.

At 02:45 on 25 November an Ottoman cavalry patrol near Khurbet Hadrah was chased off by a troop of 3rd Squadron Auckland Mounted Rifles Regiment. Within an hour, the Ottoman 3rd and 7th Divisions launched a heavy attack on the squadron, which withdrew to a prearranged line. Just 30 minutes later another withdrawal was forced. At about 08:00 infantry units of the 54th (East Anglian) Division at Khurbet Hadrah were ordered back across the river. It was an extremely difficult operation as the bridge was now being swept by enemy fire and continuously shelled by artillery. Some individuals succeeded in crossing the bridge; some swam the river and some drowned. Once the infantry were clear, the 3rd Squadron, Auckland Mounted Rifle Regiment followed them across the bridge. The 11th (North Auckland) Squadron (Auckland Mounted Rifle Regiment) covered them with two Vickers guns at great cost, continuing to hold the bridge until 11:00, when they withdrew.

While the fighting for the Hadrah bridge was occurring, the 2nd Squadron, Wellington Mounted Rifle Regiment at Sheikh Muannis held off without any artillery support a determined attack by about 2,000 Ottoman soldiers who were covered by accurate artillery fire. As their horses had been sent back down the river to the ford on the beach, the squadrons of the New Zealand Mounted Rifles Brigade moved to reinforce the Khurbet Hadrah position, but arrived just as the withdrawal was taking place. They took up a position on the southern bank near the bridge. It was only after the Khurbet Hadrah village and bridge posts had been evacuated that the Somerset battery was able to come into action, assisted by guns of the 161st (Essex) Brigade. This support came too late, and the infantry at Sheikh Muannis near the ford were also ordered to retire. They were supported by the Somerset battery, which continued firing from a position 1,400 yd (1.3 km) south, on the southern side of the river, until after the Ottoman Army had reoccupied the village. Two troops of 10th Squadron retired slowly towards the ford on the beach near Sheikh Muannis, with the 2nd Squadron and the infantry crossing the river by means of a boat and over the weir head at the mill. The Ottoman attack was now concentrated on the Canterbury Mounted Rifles Regiment. The 1st Squadron held off the enemy until the regiment and the troops from Sheikh Muannis had crossed the ford then the squadron fell back, under covering fire from machine guns. Casualties from the New Zealand Mounted Rifles Brigade during this operation were 11 killed, 45 wounded, and three missing.

From 25 November until 1 December the New Zealand Mounted Rifles Brigade remained in support of the 54th (East Anglian) Division, which continued to hold the outpost line. At the beginning of December, the brigade was withdrawn to a rest camp near Sarona a few miles north of Jaffa until 5 January, when it relieved the Imperial Camel Corps Brigade in the foothills of the Hebron Hills.

About this time the Ottoman Eighth Army's fighting commander Friedrich Freiherr Kress von Kressenstein, was relieved of his duties. He had been in the Sinai and Palestine since 27 September 1914, leading two armies and a raiding party across the Sinai Peninsula to unsuccessfully attack the British Empire on the Suez Canal in January 1915, at Romani in August 1916, and the very successful raid on Katia in April 1916. Subsequently, he commanded the defences at Magdhaba in December 1916, at Rafa in January 1917, at Gaza and Beersheba in March, April and October 1917 and during rearguard battles up the maritime plain to Jaffa in November 1917. He was replaced by Brigadier General Djevad Pasha. On hearing the news, Allenby wrote to his wife on 28 November 1917: "I fancy that there is little love lost now between Turk and Boche."

=== Ottoman counterattacks ===
Von Falkenhayn and the Ottoman Army sought to benefit from the weakened and depleted state of the worn out British Empire divisions which had been fighting and advancing since the beginning of the month.

Owing to supply problems during the advance from Beersheba, Allenby maintained Philip W. Chetwode's XX Corps in the rear close to lines of communication. (Note: See Battle of Mughar Ridge for problems of supply which led to the XX Corps remaining in the rear.) These troops enjoyed 10 days resting in the rear, where they were easily supplied and refitted. It was these fresh troops of XX Corps which were ordered to take over responsibility for front line operations in the Hebron Hills against the defending Ottoman Seventh Army. The 60th (London) Division, commanded by Major General John Shea, arrived at Latron on 23 November from Huj and on 28 November relieved the seriously weakened infantry in the 52nd (Lowland) and 75th Divisions without much of a reduction in fighting ability. On the same day, the 74th (Yeomanry) Division, commanded by Major General E. S. Girdwood, arrived at Latron from Karm. Two days later the 10th (Irish) Division, commanded by Major General J. R. Longley, also arrived at Latron from Karm. The 53rd (Welsh) Division, with the Corps Cavalry Regiment and a heavy battery attached, remained on the Hebron road north of Beersheba, coming under direct orders from General Headquarters (GHQ); they became known as Mott's Detachment.

During the week beginning 27 November the Ottoman Army launched a series of infantry attacks employing shock tactics in the hope of breaking the British lines during the period of destabilisation created by troop reinforcements and withdrawals. Counterattacks were launched by the Ottoman 16th and 19th Divisions in the Hebron Hills on Nebi Samweil and on the Zeitun plateau. Attacks were also launched against British lines of communication via a gap between the British forces on the maritime plain and those in the Hebron Hills and also against several British units spread out on the maritime plain.

==== Counterattacks on the maritime plain ====
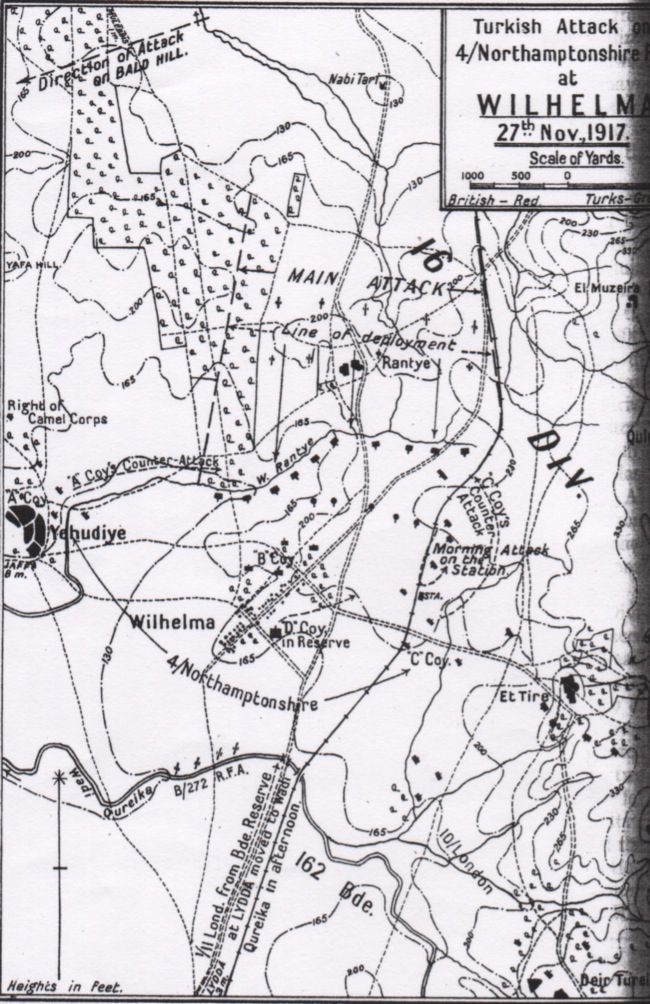
Turkish Attack on 4th Northamptonshire Regiment at Wilhelma 27 November 1917

At 17:00 on 27 November the Ottoman Eighth Army's 16th Division launched a counterattack at Wilhelma on the maritime plain. They reached to within 400 yd (370 m) of infantry in the 4th Battalion, Northamptonshire Regiment, which was deployed in and around Wilhelma. They also advanced against the 10th Battalion, London Regiment, south-east at Deir Tuweif, against the 5th Battalion, Bedfordshire Regiment, at Beit Nebala, and against the Imperial Camel Corps Brigade at Bald Hill. At Wilhelma, the Ottoman force prepared to make a bayonet attack, but machine gun and Lewis gun fire with 272nd Brigade Royal Field Artillery held them off. (Note: Together with the 270th and 271st Brigades RFA, the 272nd Brigade was attached to the 54th (East Anglian) Division commanded by Major General S. W. Hare.) The British successfully counterattacked on both flanks, forcing the Ottoman troops to withdraw to Rantye. On the left of the Imperial Camel Corps Brigade south west of Bald Hill, units of the Ottoman 16th Division renewed the attack during the night of 28 November. They drove in the right outposts of the 2nd Light Horse Brigade's front line and entrenched themselves in this forward position. But at dawn on 29 November the Ottoman soldiers found themselves in an untenable position—overlooked by one Australian post and enfiladed by others on either flank. Unable to advance or retreat, three officers and 147 troops with four machine guns surrendered to the 7th Light Horse Regiment.

==== Counterattacks on British Empire lines of communication ====
Further inland, another serious attack was made on the British lines of communication from Ramleh by units of both the Ottoman 16th Division on the plain and the 19th Division in the hills. The aim of this counterattack was the destruction of two British Empire divisions in the hills by cutting their lines of communication.

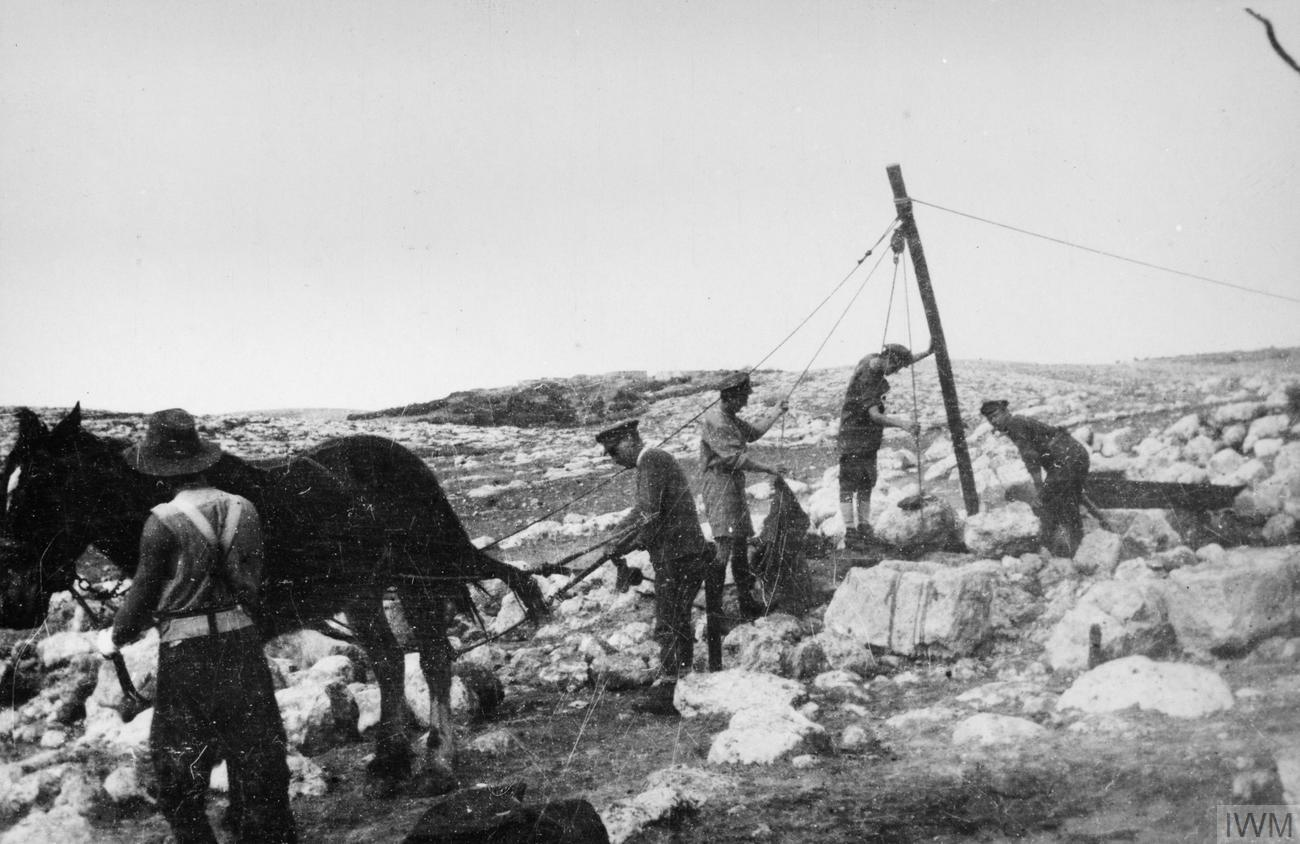
Raising water from a well in the hills west of Jerusalem in December 1917

This attack was made by exploiting a 5 mi (8.0 km) gap in the British front line between the thinly spread Yeomanry Mounted Division's left at Beit Ur el Tahta and the right of the equally thinly spread infantry in the 54th (East Anglian) Division at Shilta. The Ottoman 19th Division found the gap on 27 November and attacked the exposed supply line, defeating a section of the Yeomanry Mounted Division's Ammunition Column and overwhelming a post on the right of the 54th (East Anglian) Division. The 7th Mounted Brigade was ordered forward into the gap in the line. They were attacked by the fresh Ottoman 19th Division at dawn on 28 November, but blocked a further attack by other Ottoman units.

After some desperate fighting in close action, pressure eased somewhat and some lost ground was recovered, but the Ottoman force began to outflank the mounted brigade to the west. The 5th Battalion, Norfolk Regiment were driven out of Shilta, but infantry from the 155th (South Scottish) Brigade of the 52nd (Lowland) Division, in the process of being relieved, returned to the front, closed the gap, and pushed the Ottoman soldiers back out of the lines of communication.

==== Counterattacks on the Yeomanry Mounted Division ====
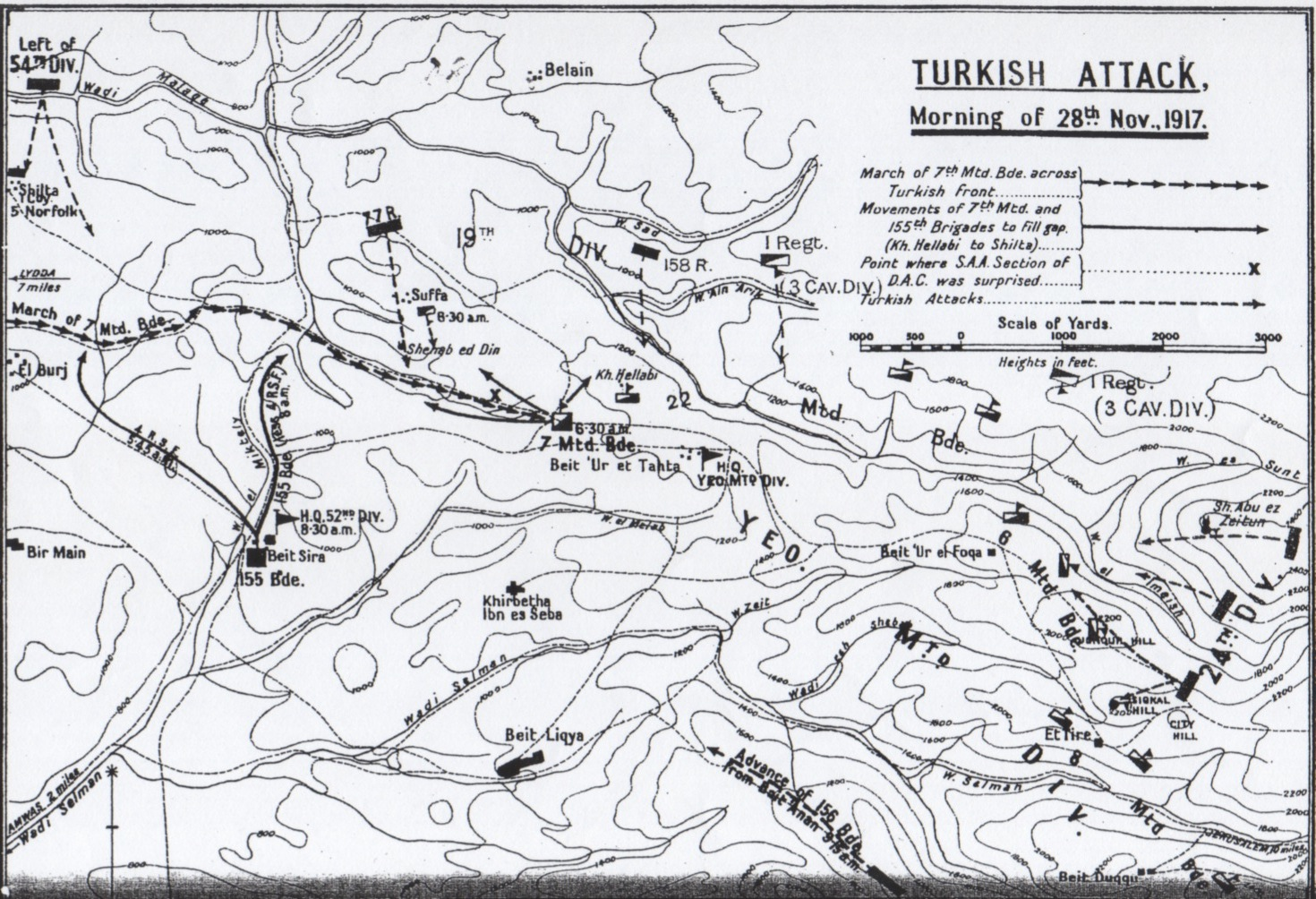
Detail of Ottoman counterattack on morning of 28 November 1917

Ottoman counterattacks began on 27 November, when the Yeomanry Mounted Division's most advanced post at Zeitun on the western end of the Beitunia Ridge was attacked by a much larger force. They held off the Ottoman attackers until 28 November, when the division was forced to withdraw from their advanced posts, including Sheik Abu ex Zeitun and Beit Ur el Foqa.

The Australian Mounted Division (less the 5th Mounted Yeomanry Brigade) had been resting at Mejdel from 19 to 27 November when they were ordered to return to the Hebron Hills. The 4th Light Horse Brigade's march to Berfilya was diverted straight on to Beit Ur el Tahta. South of Beit Ur el Tahta, the 4th Light Horse Brigade covered a dangerous position, as there was no contact between the 8th and 6th Mounted Brigades. The 5th Mounted Yeomanry Brigade was ordered to rejoin its division, leaving the 10th Light Horse Regiment under orders of the 60th (2/2nd London) Division. The 3rd Light Horse Brigade marched on to Berfilya 2 mi (3.2 km) west of el Burj. (Note: A quarter of the men of these brigades took the horses to the rear. Each man had four horses to look after day and night and as these "led horses" were prime targets for aerial bombing, it was both solid and dangerous work.[Hamilton 1996, p. 91])

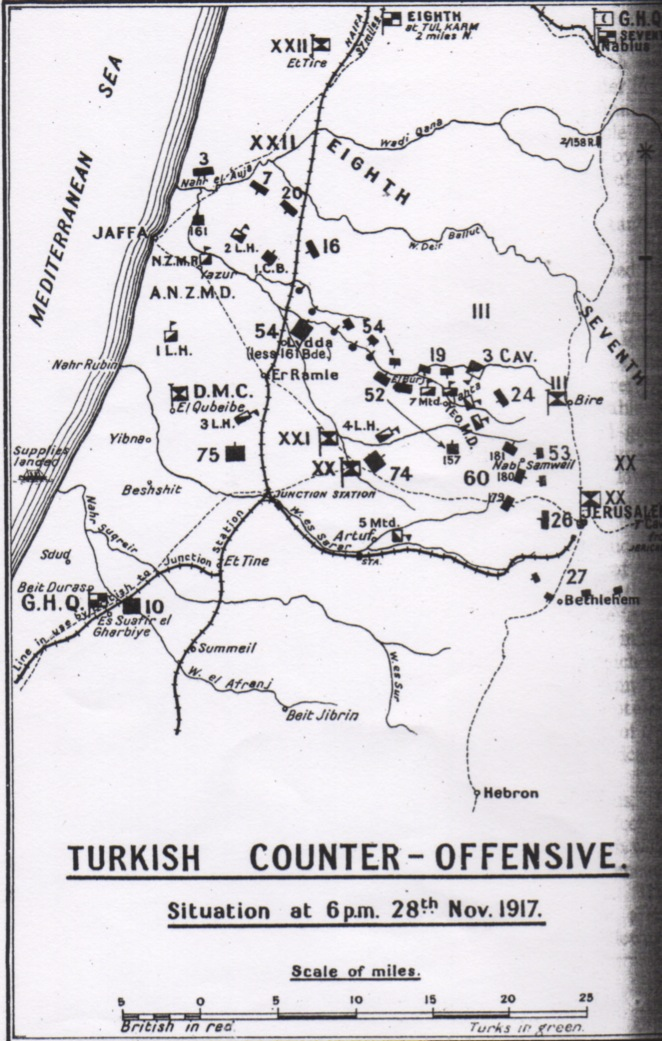
Ottoman counterattacks 1800 28 November 1917

The pressure had been too great for the advance posts of the much-reduced Yeomanry Mounted Division, which fell back down the Wadi Zeit but the pursuing Ottoman force was suddenly blocked by the 11th Light Horse Regiment of 4th Light Horse Brigade. The 4th Light Horse Brigade had moved by the same route as the 7th Mounted Brigade, but near El Burj they found the road blocked by fire. Brigadier General Grant, reporting to Barrow, ordered the brigade south of Beit Ur el Tahta to support the 6th Mounted Brigade. The 11th Light Horse Regiment was pushed forward with two machine guns to hold Wadi Zeit south west of Beit Ur el Foqa.

On 30 November Major J.G. Rees of the 25th Battalion, Royal Welch Fusiliers had only 60 men to hold Beit Ur el Foqa when the post was almost surrounded. They managed to break out of the position and joined the support company of the 10th Battalion, King's Shropshire Light Infantry covering Et Tire and facing Signal Hill, which became the focus of the next Ottoman attack. This came at 14:30 when they attacked with 400 soldiers, driving the detachment from Signal Hill. This move made Et Tire untenable and forced the 10th King's Shropshire Light Infantry to fall back to its original line. (Note: For a description of the 25th Royal Welch Fusiliers advance north west on Beit Ur el Foqa and capture of 450 Ottoman soldiers, see Falls 1930, p. 233.)

These operations were supported on 28 November by a combined force of the British and Australian Nos. 1 and 111 Squadrons, which attacked the Tul Keram aerodrome with aerial bombing. This attack was repeated the following morning and evening after German planes bombed the Julis aerodrome and hit No. 113 Squadron's orderly room.

The Yeomanry Mounted Division was relieved by the 74th (Yeomanry) Division; two brigades of infantry were substituted for four brigades of cavalry resulting in a sixfold increase in the number of rifles. With additional reinforcements from the dismounted Australian Mounted Division, there were sufficient troops to hold all Ottoman counterattacks.

==== Counterattack on 1 December at Beit Ur el Tahta ====
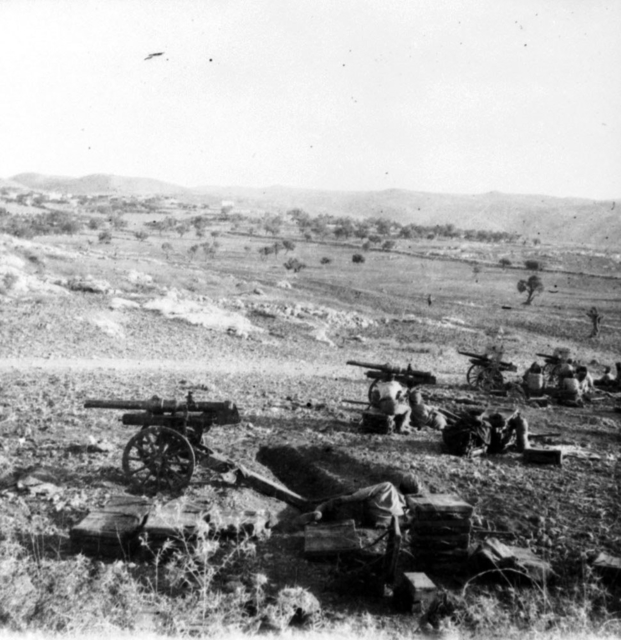
Hong Kong (Indian) mountain gun battery in action near Beit Ur el Tahta

At about 01:00 on 1 December a battalion of the Ottoman 19th Division, armed with hand grenades, launched attacks at Beit Ur el Tahta against the 157th Brigade, and north east of El Burj against the 3rd Light Horse Brigade. After two attempts at Beit Ur el Tahta, they succeeded in driving a severely weakened infantry company of the 5th Battalion, Highland Light Infantry, 52nd (Lowland) Division, off 200 yd (180 m) of the ridge in front of the village, but by 04:30 they had reoccupied the position. The 8th Light Horse Regiment north east of El Burj withstood four onslaughts by enemy forces armed with stick grenades. A squadron of the Royal Gloucestershire Hussars of the 5th Mounted Yeomanry Brigade, attached to the 3rd Light Horse Brigade was rushed up to fill gaps in the line, and the Hong Kong Battery came into action. They were reinforced by the 4th Battalion, Royal Scots Fusiliers with a small group of bombers from Beit Sira, which arrived just as Ottoman soldiers launched a new assault. The British bombing party attacked Ottoman bombers and after a fierce engagement forced them back. The Ottomans continued desperately to attack and another company of the 4th Scots Fusiliers came up. Combined with the steady fire of the dismounted 3rd Light Horse Brigade, the shower of bombs from the Fusiliers forced the Ottoman soldiers to fall back and dig in. At dawn they surrendered. (Note: One Scotsman furiously roared as he hurled one Mills grenade after another: "They mairched us a hunnder miles! (Tak' that, ya ...!) An' we've been in five fechts! (Anither yin, ya ... !) And they said we wur relieved! (Tak' that, ya ...!) And we're ott oor beds anither nicht! (Swalla that, ya ...!)." [quoted in Woodward 2006, pp. 145–6])

In these engagements it is claimed that a whole Ottoman battalion was captured or killed. Over 100 Ottoman soldiers were killed. Among the 172 prisoners were many wounded, while the British losses were under 60. It had been a crucial battle; if El Burj had been captured the British would have lost the use of the road leading up from Berfilya, and the Beit Nuba–Beit Sira valley would have become untenable. The left flank of the infantry's main advance on Jerusalem would have been exposed, which would have also weakened the pressure being exerted towards the Nablus road.

==== Counterattack on 1 December at Nebi Samwil ====
Further attacks on Nebi Samwill on 1 December were repulsed, with the Ottoman Seventh Army suffering heavy losses.

=== Capture of Jerusalem ===
On 4 December Allenby wrote: I want to get Bire[h], before I consolidate; as it covers all the roads, and commands everything. ... If I get Bire[h] and the hills covering the mouth of the Auja river N. of Jaffa I shall be in a good strong position; for offence or defence. I must anyhow consolidate there, and wait till my railway is developed. I am running short of officers and some of my strengths are getting low ... I have no reserve units.

— General Allenby letter 4 December 1917 to William Robertson, Chief of the Imperial General Staff

By 1 December the fighting for Jerusalem was almost over. The Ottoman Army had failed to win any ground as a result of their counterattacks, and the advancing British troops were successfully replacing their tired comrades who were well entrenched close to Jerusalem. On 2 December the relief of the XXI Corps by the XX Corps was completed when the 10th (Irish) Division relieved the 52nd (Lowland) Division. And each side began to adjust and improve their lines, leaving insecure or hard to defend places. The British increased the number of soldiers in their line to create a powerful concentration. Over four days the 10th (Irish) and 74th (Yeomanry) Divisions extended their positions, while the extended position held by the 60th (2/2nd London) Division was shortened.

On 3 December, the 16th Battalion Devonshire Regiment, 229th Brigade, 74th (Yeomanry) Division recaptured Beit Ur el Foqa. This infantry attack was launched from the head of the Wadi Zeit at 01:00, and by 03:30 the village had been captured, along with 17 prisoners and three machine guns. The position was impossible to hold, as it was overlooked by Ottoman positions on higher ground. Bombing and hand-to-hand fighting continued all morning, and the battalion withdrew, suffering 300 casualties. It has been claimed that on 3 December the Ottoman Army had abandoned their counterattacks and that fighting in the Hebron Hills ceased.

==== Mott's Detachment ====
Meanwhile, on the Hebron to Bethlehem road south of Jerusalem, the 53rd (Welsh) Division (known as Mott's Detachment) had continued their tentative advance to arrive 4.5 mi (7.2 km) south of Hebron on 4 December. After two Australian light armoured cars of the Light Armoured Motor Battery (LAMB) drove in from the north reporting no Ottoman units in Hebron, they continued on to the Dilbe valley that night. (Note: A Light Car Patrol raided Beit Jibrin and Beit Netief, and at the Wadi es Sunt, they drove past a company of Ottoman soldiers and opened fire with their machine guns while driving at full speed through the Ottoman lines. Unable to retire, they drove on towards Solomon's Pools and south to Hebron, which they found deserted by the Ottoman Army. They eventually reached the British lines a few miles further south. [Powles pp. 166–7])

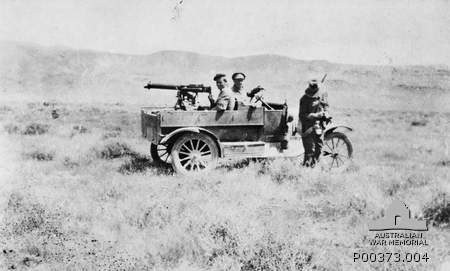
Model T Ford Utility manned by Australian soldiers and armed with Vickers .303 machine gun mounted on a tripod

Chetwode then ordered Mott to advance as quickly as possible to get into a position 3 mi (4.8 km) south of Jerusalem by the morning of 8 December. Mott's advanced guard again moved tentatively during the night of 5 December to 3 mi (4.8 km) north of Hebron. By 7 December Mott's Detachment had found touch with the Ottoman position defending Bethlehem 4 mi (6.4 km) from his objective, but bad weather prevented an advance. Mott's Detachment was to have advanced northwards in time to cover the right flank of the 60th (2/2nd London) Division and to cut the road from Jerusalem to Jericho. Despite being under direct orders of GHQ, Mott's Detachment was still on the Hebron road south of Bethlehem on 7 December. Mott managed to capture Solomon's Pools to the south of Bethlehem by the evening of 7 December.

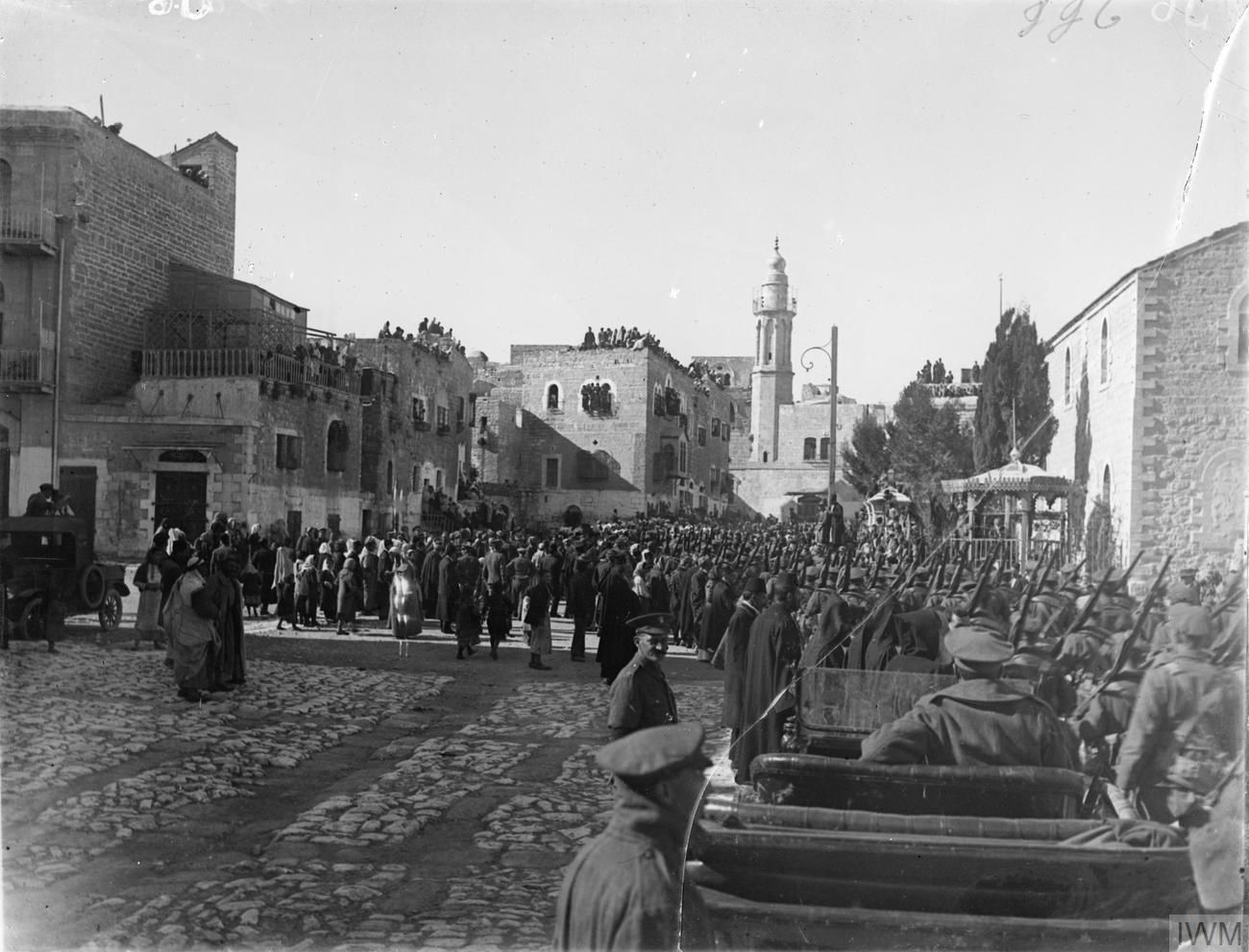
4th Battalion, Royal Sussex Regiment march through Bethlehem. Their infantry division; the 53rd (Welsh) Division occupied Bethlehem on night of 9 December

On the morning of 8 December, Ottoman artillery began firing on a road junction, which Mott's Detachment had to negotiate. Unable to advance or retaliate against the accurate shell fire from an Ottoman battery near Bethlehem, the detachment waited. At around noon, Chetwode, the corps' commander, ordered the detachment to get moving. Mott finally attacked his main objective at Beit Jala at 16:00, but the Ottoman Army had already retired. It was not until the evening that they continued their advance and found the way completely clear of Ottoman defenders. At the crucial moment, Mott's Detachment was unable to cover the southern flank of the 60th (London) Division, forcing the Londoners to pause during daylight, as enfilading fire would have made any advance extremely costly.

==== Surrender of Jerusalem ====
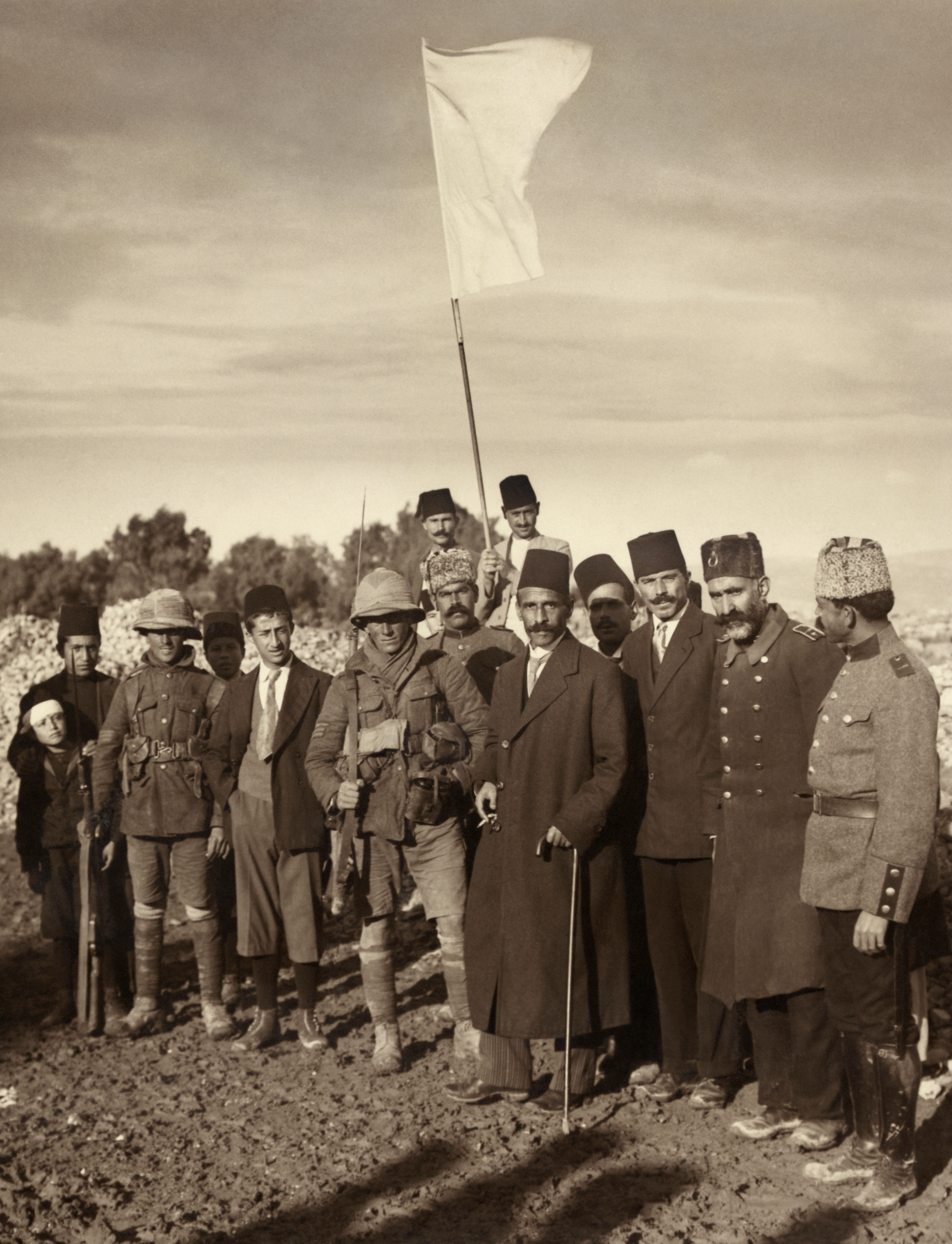
The surrender of Jerusalem to the British, 9 December 1917

During almost continuous rain on 8 December, Jerusalem ceased to be protected by the Ottoman Empire. Chetwode (commander of XX Corps), who had relieved Bulfin (commander of XXI Corps), launched the final advance taking the heights to the west of Jerusalem on 8 December. The Ottoman Seventh Army retreated during the evening and the city surrendered the following day.

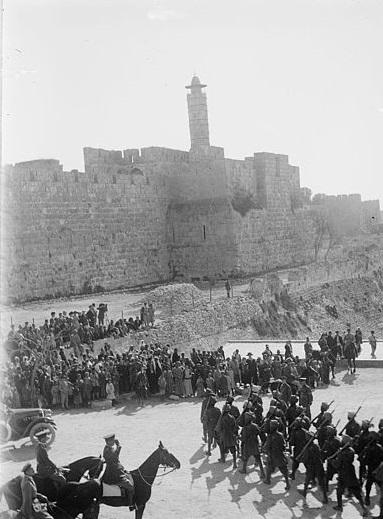
Allenby and parading Indian troops at Jaffa Gate, 11 December 1917, during official ceremonies after the capture of Jerusalem

The mayor of Jerusalem, Hussein Salim al-Husseini, attempted to deliver the Ottoman Governor's letter surrendering the city to Sergeants James Sedgewick and Frederick Hurcomb of 2/19th Battalion, London Regiment, just outside Jerusalem's western limits on the morning of 9 December 1917. The two sergeants, who were scouting ahead of Allenby's main force, refused to take the letter. It was eventually accepted by Brigadier General C.F. Watson, commanding the 180th (2/5th London) Brigade.

Jerusalem was almost encircled by the EEF, although Ottoman Army units briefly held the Mount of Olives on 9 December. They were overwhelmed by the 60th (2/2nd London) Division the following afternoon.

==== Text of surrender ====
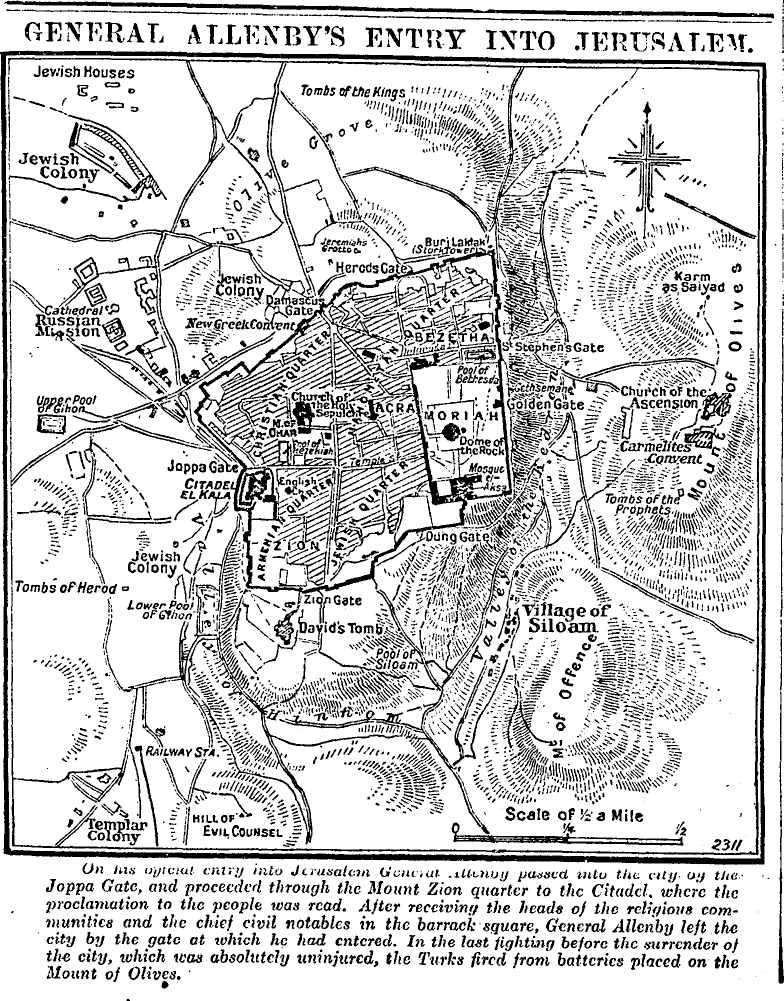
Diagram of Allenby's Entry into Jerusalem 11 Dec 1917, in The Times

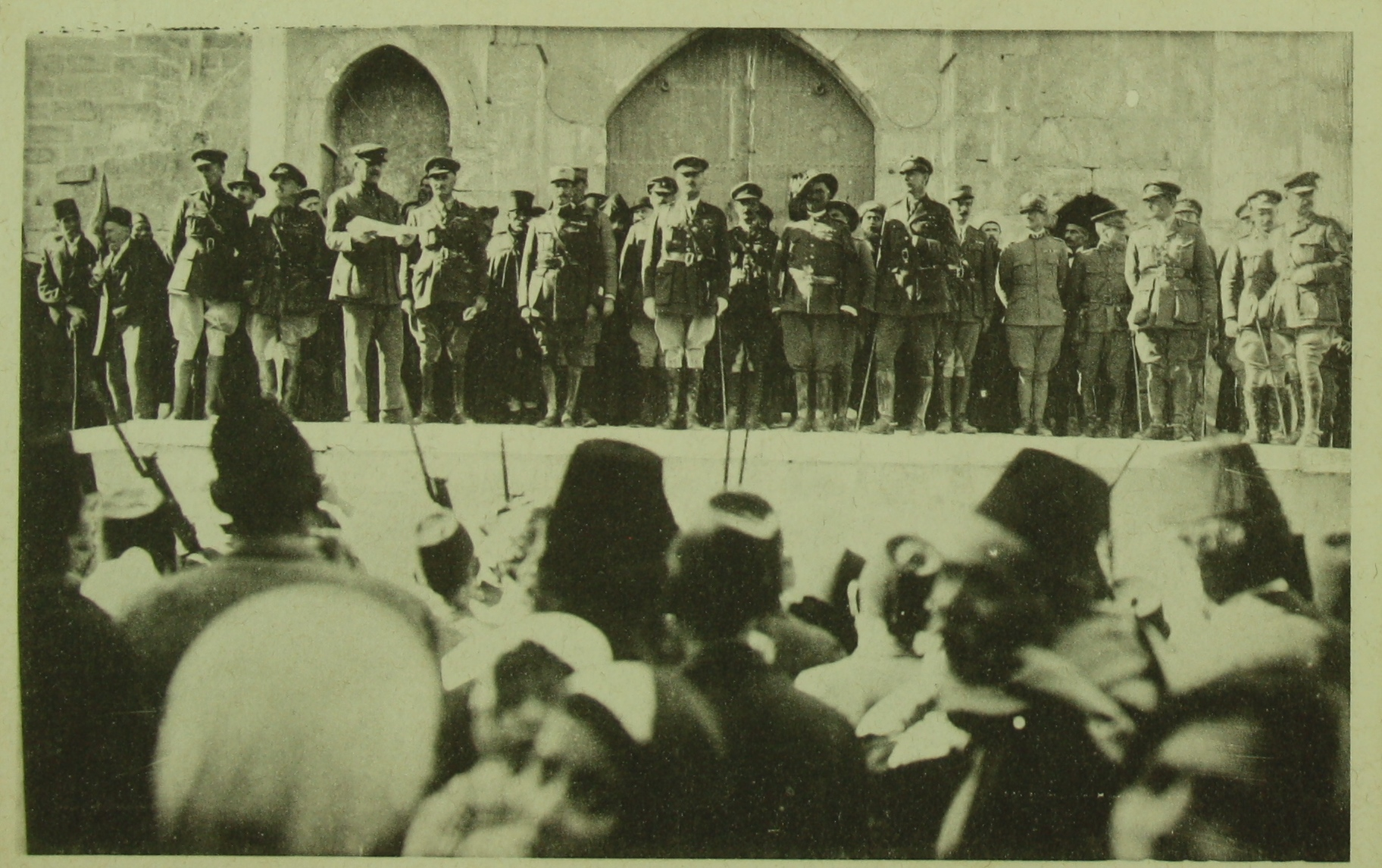
The surrender ceremony of the city of Jerusalem, in front of the Tower of David.

"Due to the severity of the siege of the city and the suffering that this peaceful country has endured from your heavy guns; and for fear that these deadly bombs will hit the holy places, we are forced to hand over to you the city through Hussein al-Husseini, the mayor of Jerusalem, hoping that you will protect Jerusalem the way we have protected it for more than five hundred years." The decree was signed by Izzat, the Mutasarrif of Jerusalem.

== Aftermath ==
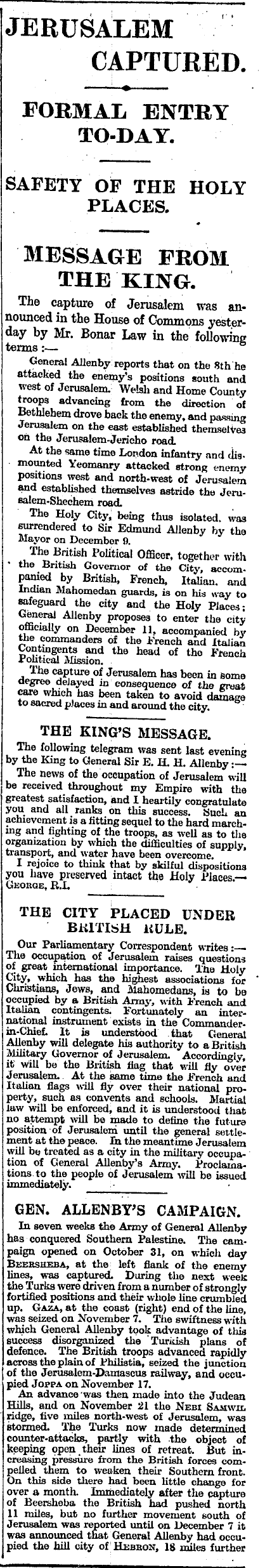
"Jerusalem Captured", in The Times, 11 Dec 1917

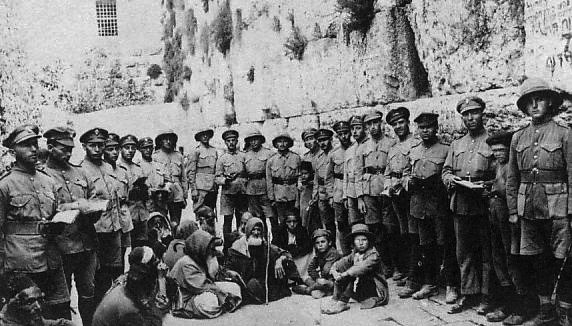
Jewish Legion soldiers at the Western Wall December 1917

On 11 December, two days after the official surrender and exactly six weeks after the fall of Beersheba, Allenby (commander of the EEF) made his formal entry into Jerusalem on foot through the Jaffa gate instead of by horse or vehicles to show his great respect for the holy place. The Australian 10th Light Horse Regiment, who had previously occupied Jerusalem on 9 December, provided a mounted guard of honour commanded by Captain Throssell VC.

Among the mounted units to accompany Allenby on his formal entrance into Jerusalem were a New Zealand Mounted Rifles Brigade representative troop commanded by 2nd Lieutenant C.J. Harris, Canterbury Regiment. The New Zealand troop was made up of one sergeant and 10 men from the Auckland Regiment, nine men from the Canterbury Regiment, and nine men from the Wellington Regiment, with three men from the Machine Gun Squadron and one from the Signal Troop – a total of one officer and 33 other ranks.

At this time the 12th Light Horse Regiment was in the Hebron Hills on the front line near Kuddis, where the disposition of the Ottoman defenders was static and quiet, but observant. From 12 December the regiment was working to extend a sangar and enjoyed fresh meat, bread, vegetables, and rum. On 17 December bivouac sheets and blankets arrived. The weather continued cold and showery, but the good rations and extra blankets and bivouac shelters lifted morale.

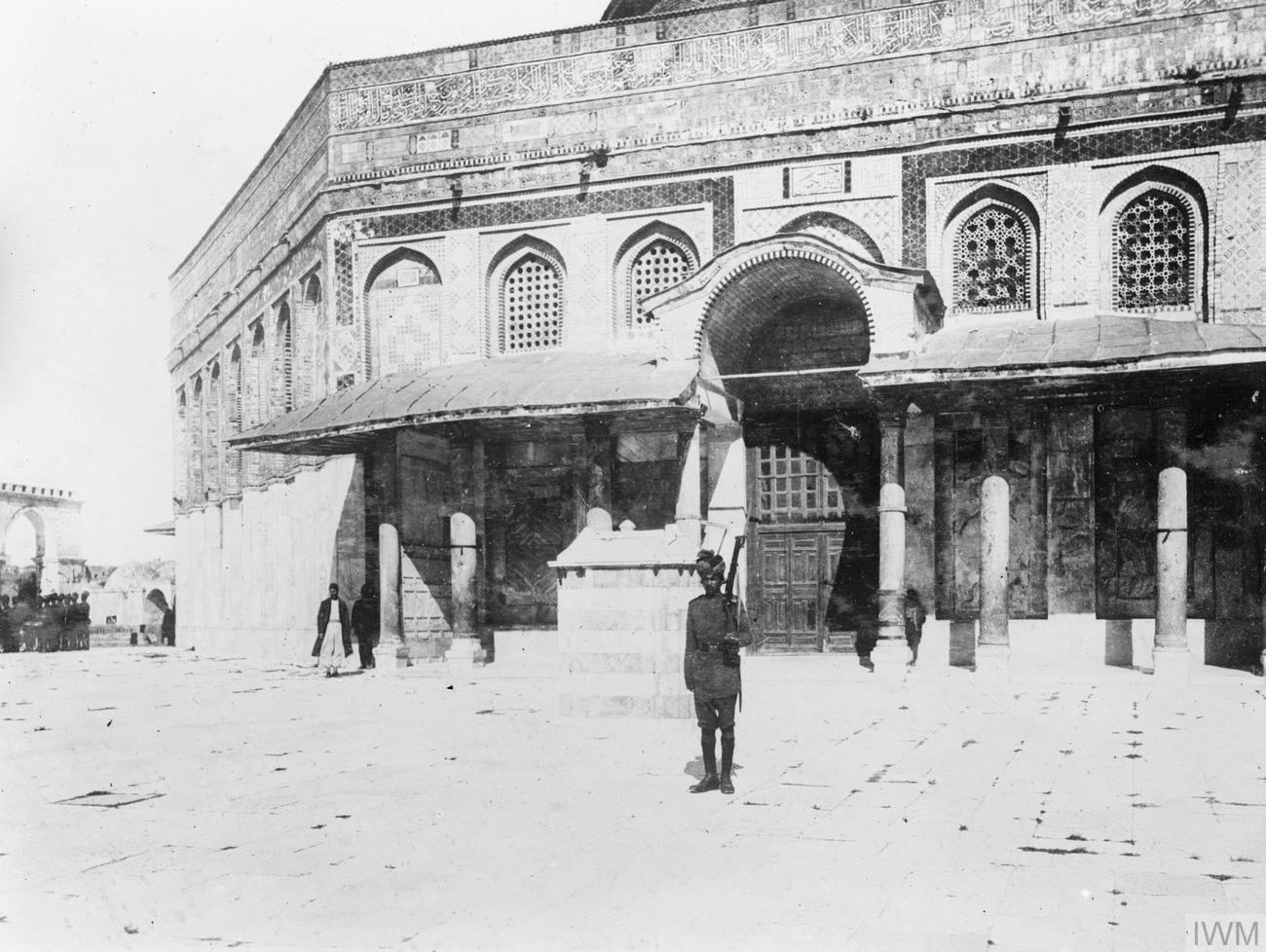
Indian sentry of 58th Vaughan's Rifles guards the Dome of the Rock

The British Empire had received the Christmas present the Prime Minister had wanted to give them, along with the moral prestige of effecting a Christian control of Jerusalem. It was a huge blow to the Ottoman Empire, which had suffered the loss of yet another Muslim Holy Place (having already lost Mecca and Baghdad).

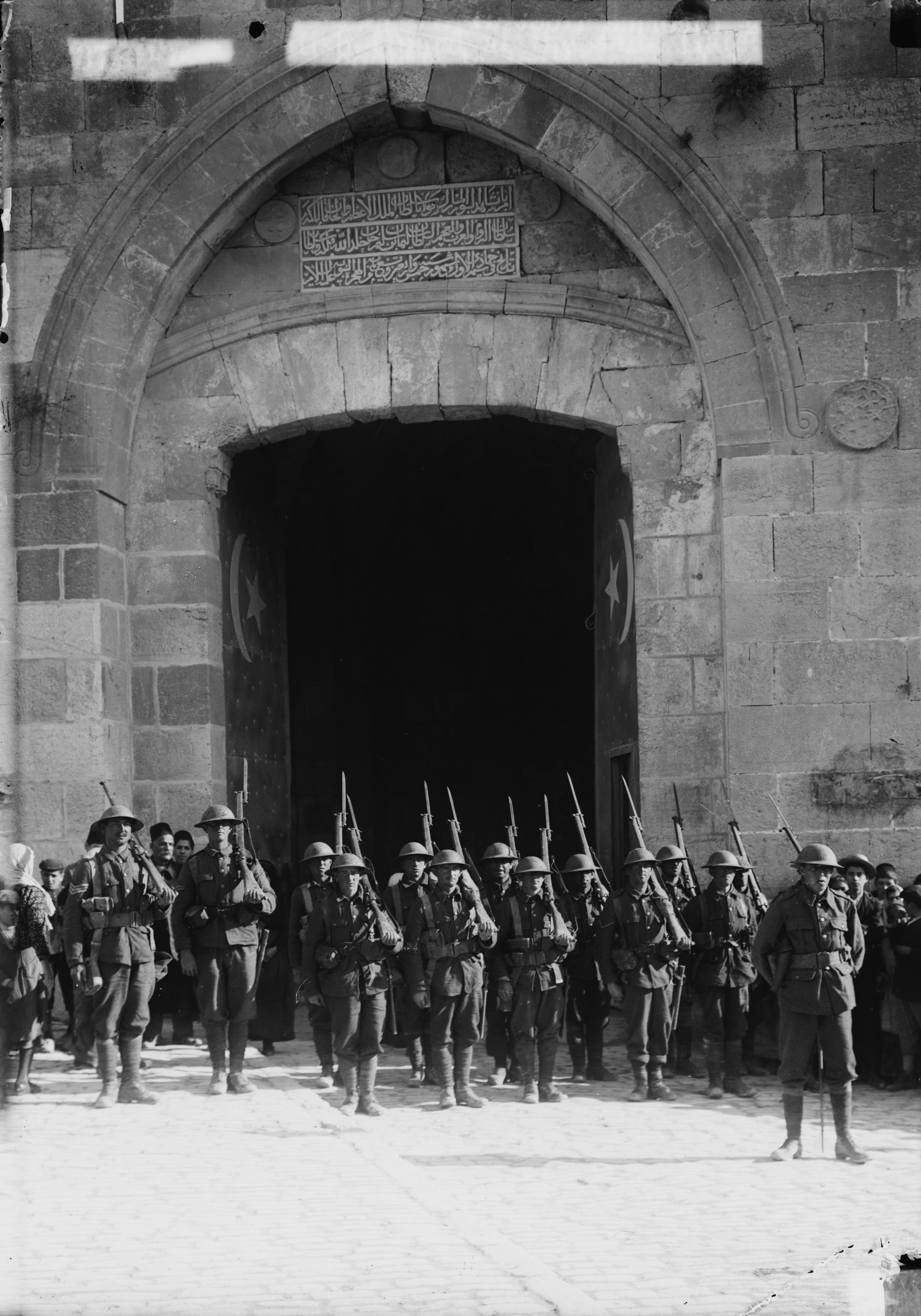
First British guard at the Jaffa Gate

During the fighting advance to Jerusalem from Beersheba and Gaza, the total British Empire casualties were 18,000, with the Ottoman suffering 25,000 casualties. British casualties during the Battle of Jerusalem from 25 November to 10 December were 1,667. In the same period 1,800 Ottoman prisoners were taken.

Eleven Ottoman infantry divisions had been forced to retire, suffering 28,443 casualties; some 12,000 prisoners were captured, 100 guns, and scores of machine guns were also captured. Now the Ottoman Army needed to deploy troops from other theatres to make up for these significant losses. On 15 December the Ottoman 2nd Caucasian Cavalry Division arrived in Palestine and became the reserve of the XXII Corps before taking part in the counterattacks of 27 December. The 1st Infantry Division arrived from the Caucasus and moved to Nablus in reserve. A significant consequence of the Ottoman Empire's firm focus on the Levant was that the British recapture of Baghdad and the British offensive in Mesopotamia became more viable and secure.

=== Strategic decisions ===
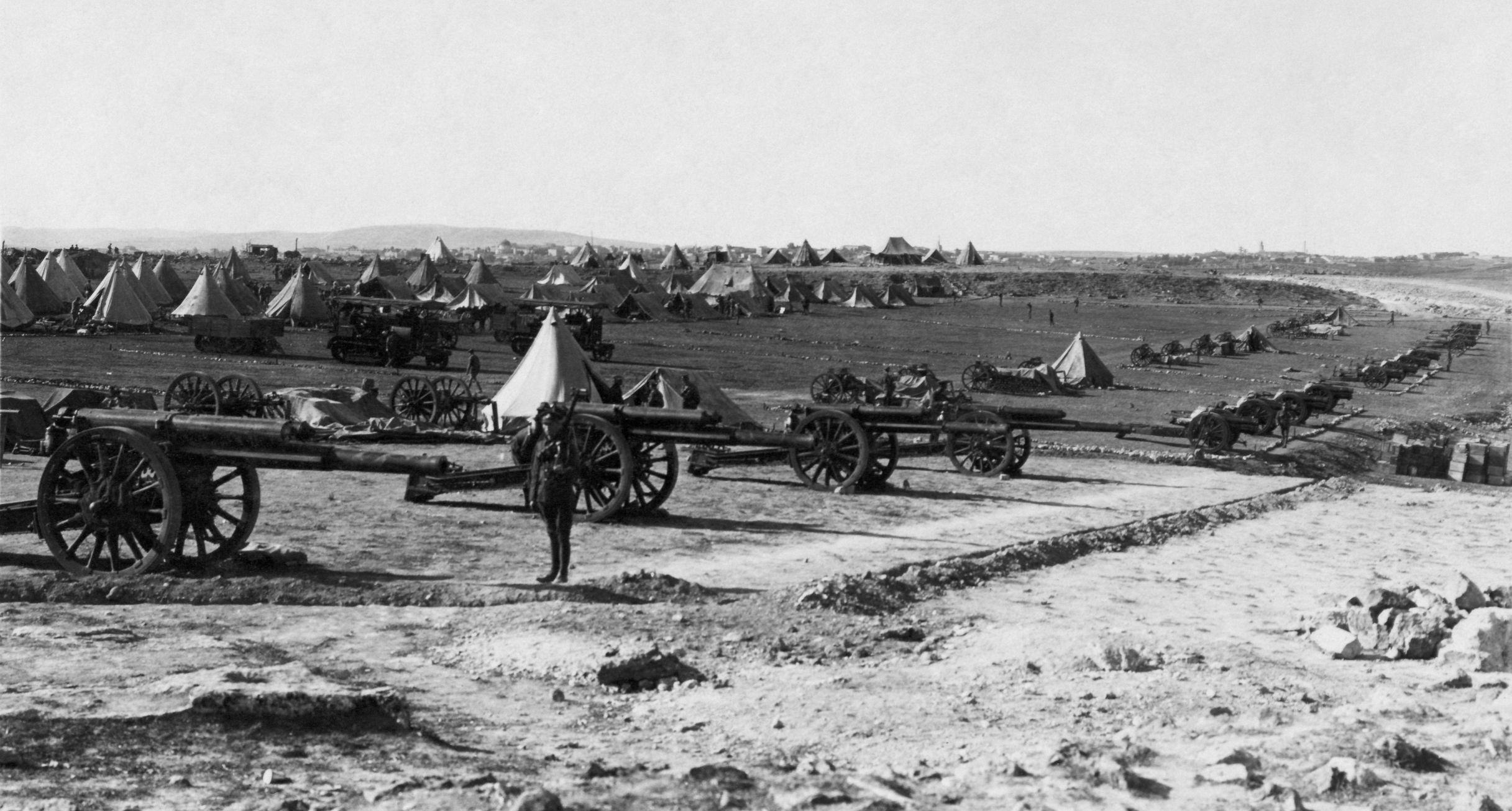
The camp of the 94th Heavy Battery on Mt Scopus after they helped capture Jerusalem

It is clear in a letter written to his wife on the day of his ceremonial entry into Jerusalem that Allenby was keeping a close eye on the evolving situation: "The Turks are driven 3 or 4 miles down the Jericho road, to the East; and some 6 or 8 miles to the North. Today we occupied Bethany."

Just before the capture of Jerusalem, the British War Office had been very worried about Allenby's extended advance and warned of a possible retirement back to Gaza and Beersheba if the war on the Western Front dictated the transfer of large numbers of troops from the Levant. This attitude changed immediately after Jerusalem was captured. The War Office then wanted to know how Allenby might exploit his success with the addition of a division from Mesopotamia.

Yesterday, morning, I reconnoitred our line, N. and E. slight fighting was in progress; and a few prisoners were coming in – fine, fighting Turks; well set up and well fed ... Later, I went to the railway station; where we are trying to repair and reconstruct what the Turks have damaged. Then Bols and I went to Bethlehem ... .

— Allenby letter to Lady Allenby 14 December 1917

Allenby's great strategic successes from the end of October 1917 brought pressure from the British War Office to quickly finish the war in the Middle East. The War Cabinet instructed Robertson to telegraph Allenby on 18 December with a project based on alternative policies –

- (a) To complete the conquest of the whole of Palestine between Dan and Beersheba and hold the country for the remainder of the war
- (b) To continue the advance through Palestine and Syria to the vicinity of Aleppo so as to cause permanent interruption of railway communication with Mesopotamia.

Robertson requested that Allenby should send his "views as soon as possible as to the execution of these policies" and the length of time needed for the operations.

Allenby replied on 20 December 1917:

- (a) ... I calculate I might be able by June or July to place force of my present strength north of Nazareth–Haifa line, assuming enemy cannot oppose me with more than about 60,000 fighting strength and provided there are no special difficulties met with in railway construction.
- (b) To advance further towards Aleppo would mean to move against Damascus and Beirut. On that front enemy is served by broad–gauge railway with good lateral communications and apparently ideal ground for defence. Broad–gauge railway would put him on level with me as regards numbers that could be maintained. I should require 16 or 18 divisions besides my mounted corps to ensure success against Damascus–Beirut line if strongly held, but this is probably more than my railway could support. My estimate is made on the supposition enemy will make use of his broad-gauge railway to its full capacity. I would point out that Aleppo is 350 miles distant and my single line of railway advances about half a mile a day. Railhead of my double line is at Bir el Mazar, but the doubling of railway has had to be stopped during my present advance. For my immediate plans see my telegram No. E.A. 598 14 December, and I think it advisable before advancing much further north to clear Turkish forces on Medina railway."

Allenby had reported on 14 December that the rainy season would stop a renewal of operations for at least two months.

=== Second attack across the Nahr el Auja – Battle of Jaffa ===
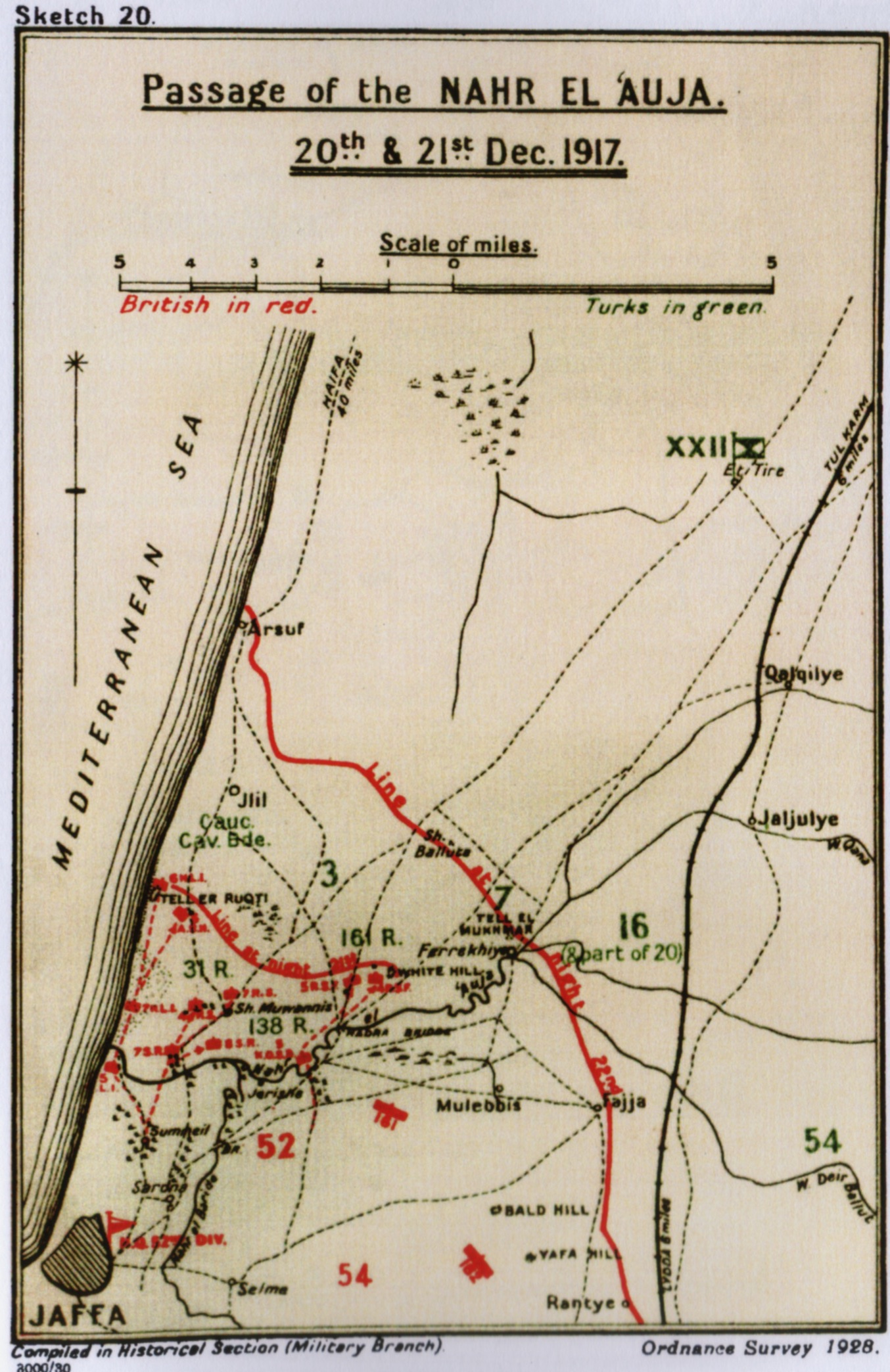
Falls' Sketch Map 20 Passage of the Nahr el 'Auja

Allenby needed to establish a defensive line running from the Mediterranean Sea which could be held with reasonable security once his right flank was secured on the Dead Sea. In order to consolidate a strong British Empire line, it was necessary to push the 3rd and 7th Infantry Divisions of the Ottoman Eighth Army back away from the Nahr el Auja 4 mi (6.4 km) north of Jaffa on the Mediterranean coast. The first attempt was made on 24 to 25 November and this second engagement in the same area became officially designated by the British as a subsidiary battle during the Jerusalem Operations. (Note: Wavell noted that these operations 'hardly merit in size or importance the name "Battle of Jaffa"' given to them by the Battles Nomenclature Committee. [Wavell 1968, p. 169])

Three infantry divisions of the XXI Corps began moving their units into position on the coastal plain on 7 December. The 75th Division was on the right with the 54th (East Anglian) Division in the centre and the 52nd (Lowland) Division on the coast. Infantry from the 162nd (East Midland) Brigade, relieved the New Zealand Mounted Rifles Brigade in the front line on 11 December and the mounted riflemen, who had been heavily involved in the earlier attempt to capture the Nahr el Auja, moved back to bivouac near Ayun Kara. (Note: The Auckland Mounted Rifles Regiment was sent into Jaffa and came under orders of the 52nd (Lowland) Division. On 12 December the Wellington Mounted Rifles Regiment was sent to the village of Beit Dejan on the Jaffa to Ramleh road where it came under orders of an infantry division; the 54th (East Anglian) Division. By Christmas Day the Canterbury Mounted Rifle Regiment was back at Ashdod, while the Auckland and Wellington Mounted Rifles Regiments spent Christmas Day on the march to Ashdod, with Divisional Headquarters and other units of the Anzac Mounted Division following on Boxing Day.)

Military operations resumed a fortnight after the surrender of Jerusalem with the final attack of this campaign. But preparations were complicated by the sodden state of the low and swampy ground on the southern banks of the Nahr el Auja where the attack would be launched. And the river was swollen by rain which had fallen on 19 and 20 December. From Mulebbis to the sea the river is between 40–50 ft (12–15 m) wide and 10–12 ft (3.0–3.7 m) deep except for the ford at the mouth of the river known as Sheik Muanis. To the north of the river two prominent spurs run down to the river from a series of sandy ridges. These overlooked the damaged stone bridge at Khurbet Hadrah to the east and the village of Sheik Muannis, near Jerisheh to the west where a mill dam bridged the stream. The Ottoman Eighth Army held strong commanding positions covering all the places used by the attackers in November. They held both spurs in addition to a post opposite the ford at the mouth of the Nahr el Auja. They also held a line extending east of Khurbet Hadrah which crossed to the south bank of the river to include Bald Hill and Mulebbis.

All three infantry brigades of the 52nd (Lowland) Division managed to cross the River Auja on the night of 20–21 December. It is claimed that by morning they had secured the Ottoman defensive line, completely surprising the defenders who surrendered without firing a shot. Temporary bridges were built so the infantry's artillery could cross the river. On 23 December the 52nd (Lowland) and 54th (East Anglian) Divisions moved up the coast a further 5 mi (8.0 km), while the left of the advance reached Arsuf 8 mi (13 km) north of Jaffa, capturing key Ottoman defensive positions. They were supported by guns on British warships. Three hundred prisoners were captured and many Ottomans were killed with bayonets, while the British infantry suffered 100 casualties. (Note: The 52nd (Lowland) Division's campaigns in Egypt and Palestine had begun in 1916 at Romani ended at Arsuf. Shortly afterwards they ordered to France.[Wavell 1968, p. 170])

=== Defence of Jerusalem ===
Officially recognised by the British as one of three battles which made up the "Jerusalem Operations", along with the Battle of Nebi Samwil and the subsidiary Battle of Jaffa, this engagement occurred a month after the Ottoman armies had launched their counterattacks; between 26 and 30 December 1917. The XX Corps' infantry divisions, the 10th (Irish), the 60th (2/2nd London), and the 74th (Yeomanry) Divisions with support from infantry in the 53rd (Welsh) Division fought the Seventh Ottoman Army's III Corps' 24th, 26th and 53rd Divisions.

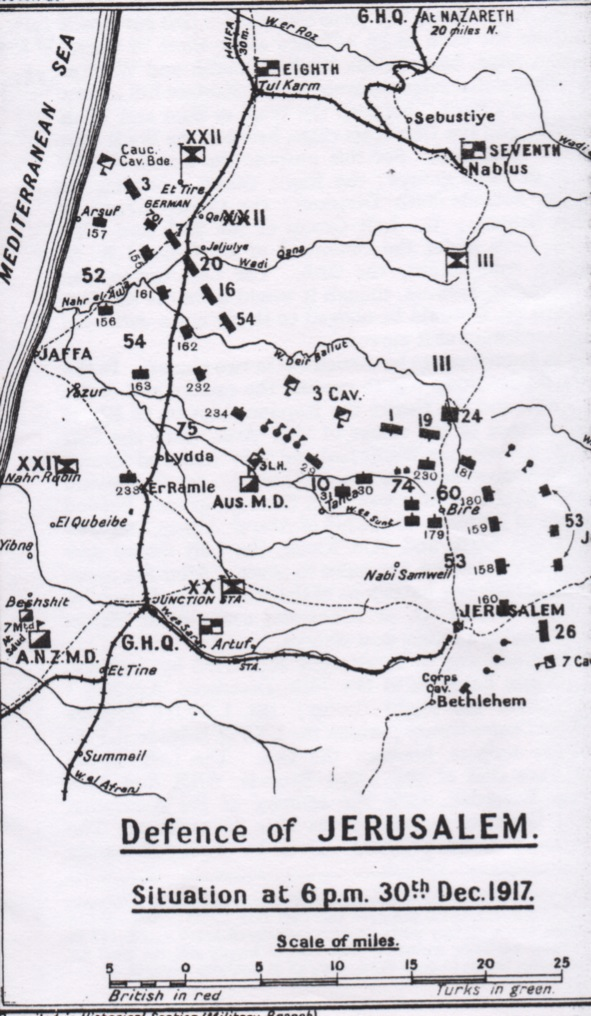
Falls' Sketch Map 21: Defence of Jerusalem. Situation on 30 December 1917 at 1800

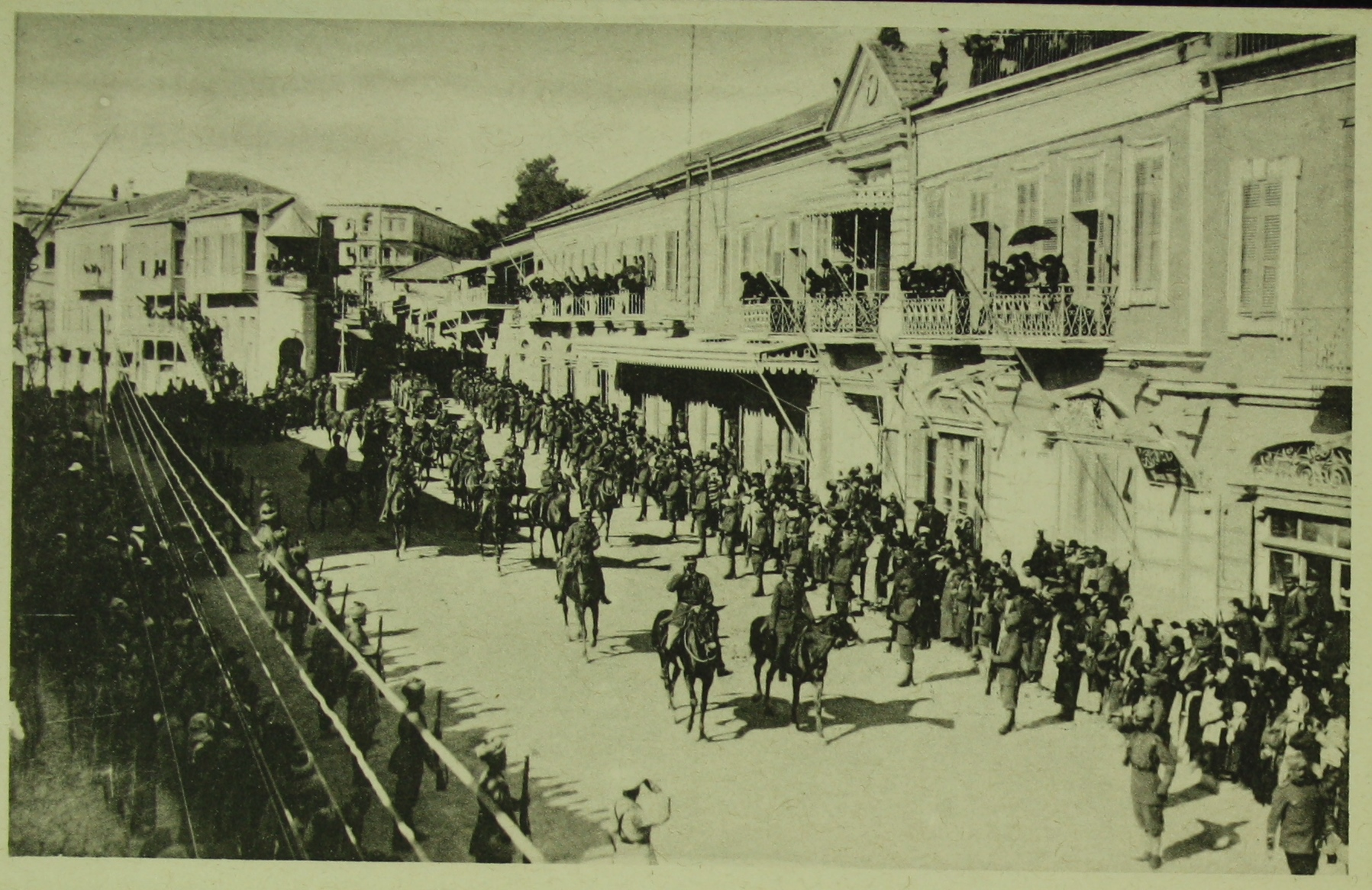
Allenby's troops march through Jaffa street.

After the evacuation of Jerusalem by the Ottoman Seventh Army, the British XX Corps held a line which ran across the Jerusalem to Jericho and Jerusalem to Nablus roads 4 mi (6.4 km) north and east of Jerusalem. This line continued to the west through the hills to Beit Ur el Foka and Suffa. Jerusalem was still within range of Ottoman artillery and with the opposing sides in such close proximity there was still the risk of counterattack. An offensive to push the Ottoman Army further northwards was planned for 24 December 1917, but was delayed due to bad weather.

In a letter to the War Office, Allenby had written on 4 December of his desire to capture Bireh. The plan now was for infantry from the 60th (2/2nd London) Division to advance north astride the Jerusalem to Nablus road with infantry from the 74th (Yeomanry) Division advancing eastwards from Beit Ur el Foka to converge on the Bireh-Ramalla ridge.

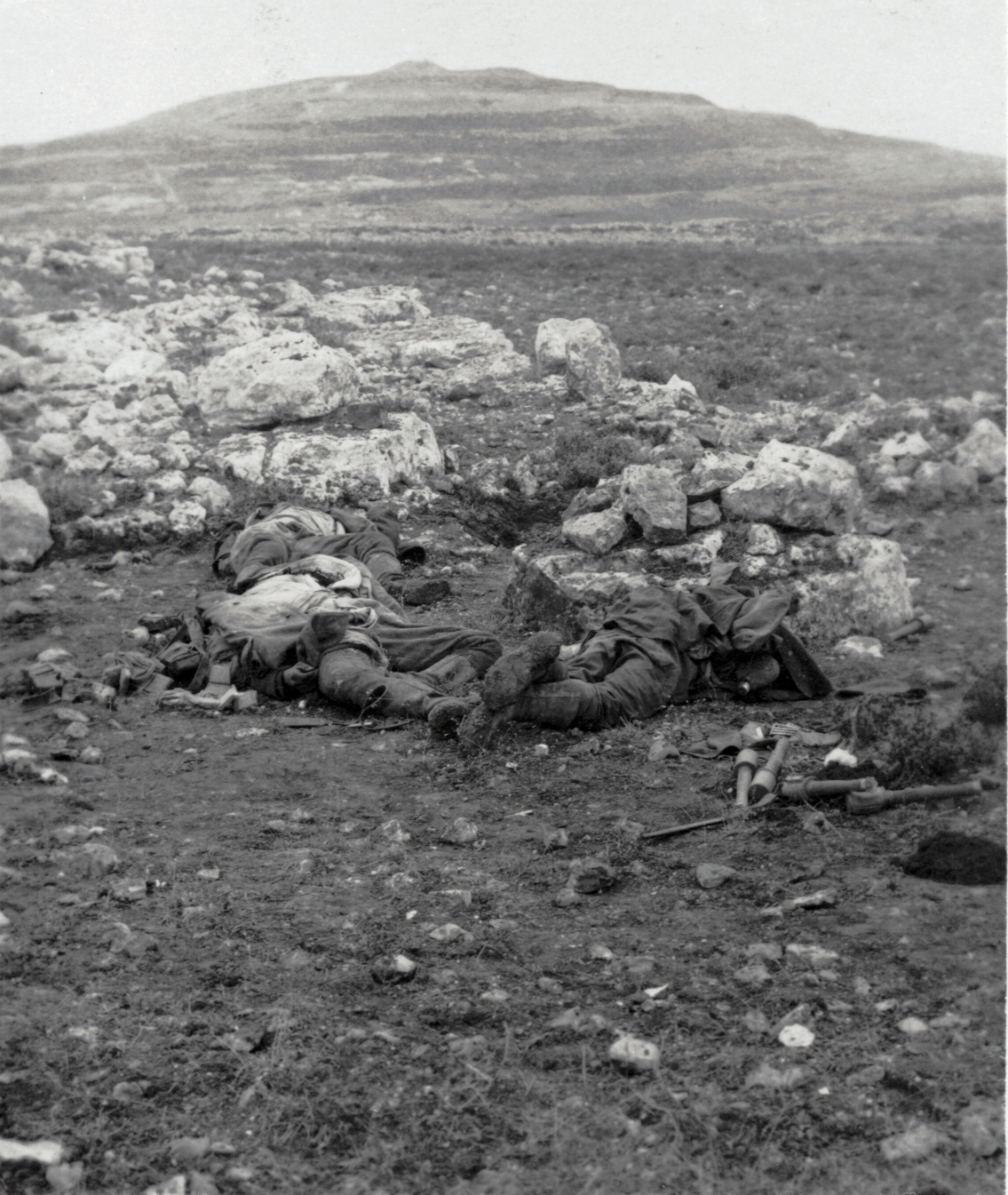
Dead Ottoman soldiers at Tel el Ful in 1917

The British were prepared for battle when an Ottoman Army counterattack was launched at 01:30 on 27 December, which fell on the infantry from the 179th (2/4th London) Brigade, 60th (2/2nd London) Division, on the Nablus road. The Ottoman force's initial objectives were a line of villages, including Nebi Samweil 1 mi (1.6 km) in front of their starting positions. They were focused towards Tell el Ful, a hill east of the Nablus road about 3 mi (4.8 km) north of Jerusalem defended by the 60th (2/2nd London) Division. This Ottoman attack on Tell el Ful initially drove the British outposts back and captured several important places. The engagement continued for two days and was ultimately unsuccessful.

Also during the morning of 27 December the British infantry from the 10th (Irish) and the 74th (Yeomanry) Divisions advanced about 4000 yds (4000 m) on a front of 6 mi (9.7 km). And the next day Chetwode, commander of XX Corps, ordered infantry in the 10th (Irish) Division to attack towards Ramallah.

The 60th (2/2nd London) Division took El Jib, Er Ram, and Rafat while the 53rd (Welsh) Division covered their left. The 74th (Yeomanry) Division captured Beitunia and the 10th (Irish) Division pushed to the east of Ain Arik. With Ottoman and German machine guns hard to locate amongst the boulders, the fighting was severe and stubborn. On 29 December the 60th (2/2nd London) and 74th (Yeomanry) Divisions were joined by the 53rd (Welsh) Division. A general British infantry advance on a 12 mi (19 km) front moved their front line 6 mi (9.7 km) on the right and 3 mi (4.8 km) on the left. They pushed the whole line along the Nablus road to beyond Ramallah and Bireh by 30 December. Final objectives were gained and the line along the whole front secured.

The Ottoman Army lost over 1,000 casualties and 750 prisoners; the British infantry captured 24 machine guns and three automatic rifles. (Note: Allied casualties are unknown.)

=== Summation of campaign ===
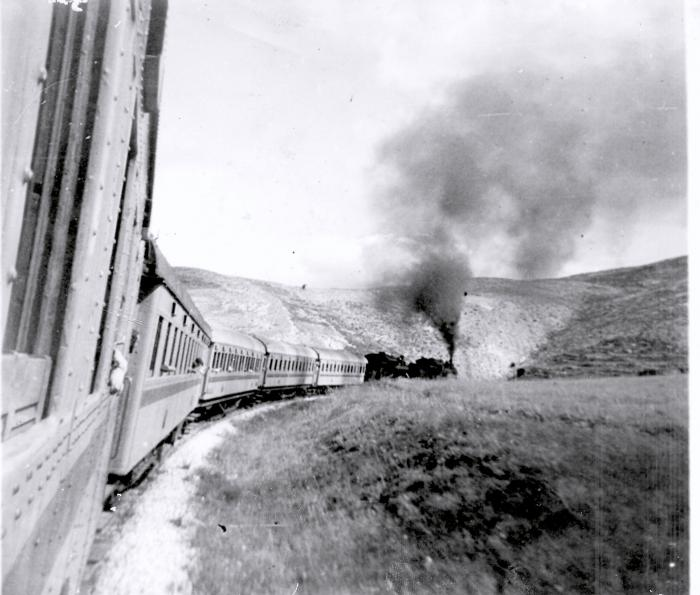
Jaffa to Jerusalem train climbing the Hebron Hills east of Lydda in 1947

The newly established, strategically strong defensive British line remained in place until mid September 1918 when the advance to Damascus and Aleppo, which ended the war in this theatre, took place. It stretched across from the Mediterranean coast in the west to north and east of Jerusalem. The line was extended during the middle of February 1918 when Jericho in the Jordan Valley was captured and the eastern end of the line was secured on the Dead Sea.

The enormous territorial gains of the Palestine offensive contrasted with the British Expeditionary Force's offensive on the Western Front at Cambrai. Fought in Flanders from 20 to 30 November, it ended with heavy losses and no gains. (Note: The Battle of Cambrai was reported in The Sydney Morning Herald under the headlines 'Deep Thrust' and 'The Great Drive' describing cavalry operations on 20 November. This engagement was celebrated as a victory with the ringing of the bells of St. Pauls in London and in Sydney where bells were to peal 'throughout the metropolitan area for five minutes.' Under the headlines 'Amazing Adventures', cavalry operations were described; under a headline of 'Thrilling Story', reporter Phillip Gibbs wrote up the story. But under the headline 'British Surprised' he had to acknowledge defeat after a German counterattack on 30 November. [Allenby to Lady Allenby 10 December 1917 and Hughes' note in Hughes 2004 pp. 104, 320] [The Sydney Morning Herald 24 November 1917 p. 3; 27 November p. 7; 28 November p. 11; 4 December 1917, p. 7]) The French army was still recovering from a serious mutiny, the Italians were defeated at the Battle of Caporetto, and Russia was out of the war following the Bolshevik Revolution. Allenby's advance by comparison made considerable territorial gains, helped secure Baghdad and the oilfields at Basra in Mesopotamia, encouraged the Arab Revolt, and inflicted irreplaceable losses on the Ottoman Army.

The EEF's campaign from October to December 1917 resulted in a military defeat of a Central Power, which led to a substantial loss of enemy territory. In particular the fighting from 31 October to 7 November against the Ottoman Gaza–Sheria–Beersheba line resulted in the first defeat of entrenched, experienced and, up until then, successful Ottoman armies which were supported by artillery, machine guns and aircraft. During these attacks the Ottoman defenders were well established in trenches, redoubts and other fortifications, requiring a "Western Front"-style of battle, as the attackers were forced to approach over open ground.

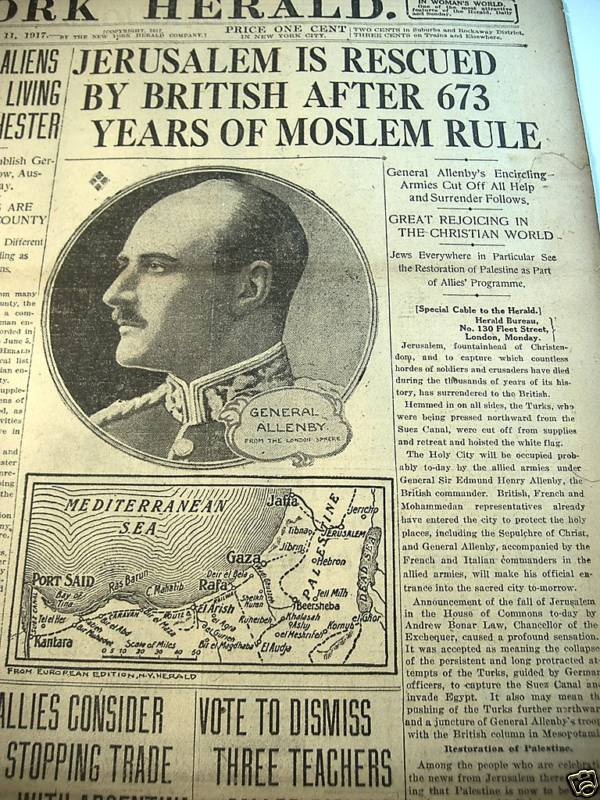
New York Herald front page on 11 December 1917 at the end of the Battle of Jerusalem. The mention of "673 years" is in reference to the continued rule of Muslims starting in 1244 under the Ayyubid dynasty.

Sporadic fighting continued in the hills surrounding Jerusalem. On Christmas Day, Falkenhayn launched another counter assault, which was repulsed with heavy losses. Some British newspapers and magazines, including The Irish News, claimed it as the end of the crusades. A US newspaper also made reference to the Crusades, specifically the New York Herald (see picture), referring to the last time Jerusalem was under non-Muslim rule in 1244 AD when a Turkic army under Al-Salih Ayyub, defeated the Franks. The secular groups of the Italian politics characterized the victory as a crusade but giving secular and contemporary meanings to this term: The military episode was considered part of the Entente's crusade in the name of freedom and civilization against the cruelty of the German "Kultur", a widely spread image of the Great War propaganda based on the demonization of the enemy. With different approaches, the Italian Catholic clergy and laity appeared generally reluctant to explicitly use of the ideology of crusade due to theological and doctrinal reasons: the conquest of Jerusalem was part of the just war conducted by the Entente, but it could not be considered like a step or the conclusion of a crusade.

Britain would hold Jerusalem until the end of Mandatory Palestine in 1948.
