= Sinai and Palestine campaign =

Campaign of the Middle Eastern theatre of World War I

- Part of the Middle Eastern theatre of World War I
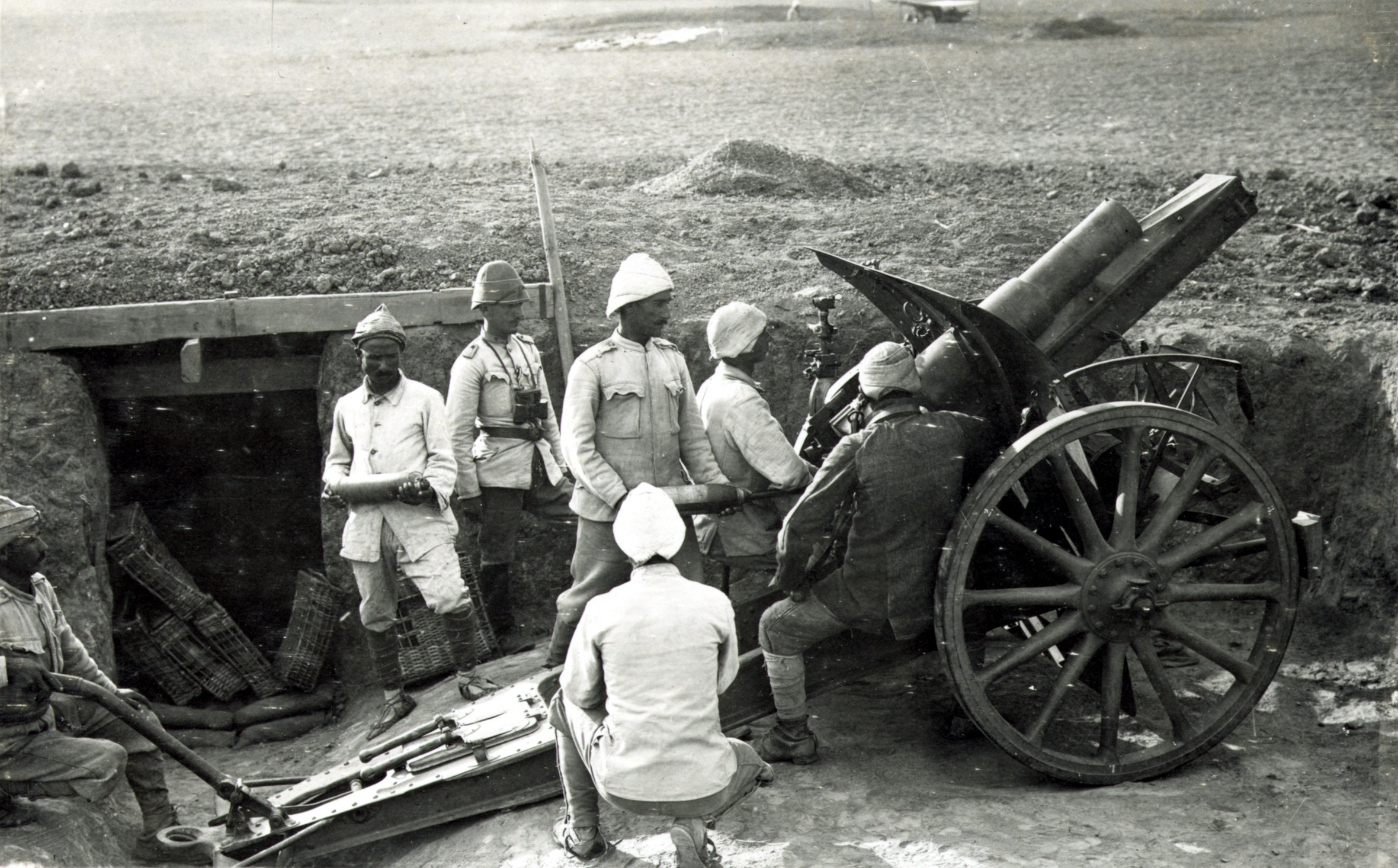
- Ottoman artillerymen with a 10.5 cm Feldhaubitze 98/09 shortly before the Battle of Hareira and Sheria amidst the Southern Palestine offensive, 1917
Date	17 November 1914 – 30 October 1918 (3 years, 11 months, 1 week and 6 days)
Location	British Egypt and Ottoman Syria
Result	Allied victory
Territorial changes	Partition of the Ottoman Empire

Belligerents
Allied Powers: United Kingdom and Empire; India; Australia; New Zealand; Newfoundland; South Africa; Rhodesia; Ceylon; Egypt; Sudan; Cyprus; Jewish Legion; Hejaz; France; Italy	Central Powers: Ottoman Empire; Germany; Austria-Hungary

Commanders and leaders
(British Empire) Julian Byng (British Empire) Archibald Murray (British Empire) Edmund Allenby (British Empire) Charles Dobell (British Empire) Philip Chetwode (British Empire) Edward Bulfin; Ahmad Helmy †; Mostafa Helmy (Australia) Harry Chauvel (British Empire) T. E. Lawrence (Arab Revolt) Hussein bin Ali (Arab Revolt) Faisal bin Hussein	(Ottoman Empire) Djemal Pasha (German Empire) F. K. von Kressenstein (German Empire) Erich von Falkenhayn (German Empire) O. L. von Sanders (German Empire) Gustav von Oppen (Ottoman Empire) Mustafa Kemal Pasha (Ottoman Empire) Fevzi Pasha (Ottoman Empire) Ismet Pasha (Ottoman Empire) Cevat Pasha (Ottoman Empire) Mersinli Djemal Pasha

Units involved
Force in Egypt (to March 1916); Egyptian Expeditionary Force: Eastern Force (until July 1917); XX Corps (formed in August 1917); XXI Corps (formed in August 1917); Desert Mounted Corps; Chaytor's Force; Sharifian Army	Fourth Army: XX Corps; XXII Corps; III Corps; Yildirim Army Group: Seventh Army; Eighth Army; German Asia Corps

Strength
1,200,000 (total); January 1915: over 150,000 men September 1918: 467,650 total number of personnel: 120,000 combat soldiers; 134,971 wage workers; 53,286 transport units	Estimated 200,000–400,000; January 1918: 257,963

Casualties and losses
(United Kingdom of Great Britain and Ireland) 61,877 battle casualties: 16,880 killed/missing; 43,712 wounded; 1,385 captured; 5,981+ died of disease c. 100,000+ evacuated sick French and Italian casualties: Unknown Total: 168,000+ casualties	(Ottoman Empire) 190,200 battle casualties: 25,973 killed/missing; ~85,497 wounded; 78,735 captured; ~40,900 died of disease (German Empire) (Austria-Hungary) Unknown total: 3,200+ captured (Note: POWs held by the end of the war are given as 5,703 officers and 96,133 other ranks, broken down by ethnicity. However that total also includes "over 3,000" Austro-German men and 206 Austro-German officers, which are listed below separately. Ottoman POWs alone would therefore be 5,497 officers and about 93,000 other ranks. Of these 8,000 were captured by the Arab insurgents under King Hussein.[Statistics of the Military Effort of the British Empire During the Great War 1914–1920, The War Office, p. 633.]); Total: 234,300+ casualties

The Sinai and Palestine campaign was part of the Middle Eastern theatre of World War I, taking place between January 1915 and October 1918. The British Empire, the French Third Republic, and the Kingdom of Italy fought alongside the Arab Revolt in opposition to the Ottoman Empire, the German Empire, and the Austro-Hungarian Empire. It started with an Ottoman attempt at raiding the Suez Canal in 1915 and ended with the Armistice of Mudros in 1918, leading to the cession of Ottoman Syria.

Fighting began in January 1915, when a German-led Ottoman force invaded the Sinai Peninsula, then occupied by the British as part of a Protectorate of Egypt, in an unsuccessful attempt to capture the Suez Canal. After the Gallipoli campaign, British Empire veterans formed the Egyptian Expeditionary Force (EEF) and Ottoman Empire veterans formed the Fourth Army, to fight for the Sinai Peninsula in 1916. In January 1917 the newly formed Desert Column completed the recapture of the Sinai at the Battle of Rafa. This recapture of substantial Egyptian territory was followed in March and April by two EEF defeats on Ottoman territory, at the First and Second Battles of Gaza in southern Palestine.

After a period of stalemate in Southern Palestine from April to October 1917, General Edmund Allenby captured Beersheba from the III Corps. The Ottoman defences were captured by 8 November, and the pursuit began. EEF victories followed, at the Battle of Mughar Ridge, 10 to 14 November, and the Battle of Jerusalem, 17 November to 30 December. Serious losses on the Western Front in March 1918, during Erich Ludendorff's German spring offensive, forced the British Empire to send reinforcements from the EEF. The advance stalled until Allenby's force resumed the offensive during the manoeuvre warfare of the Battle of Megiddo in September. The successful infantry battles at Tulkarm and Tabsor created gaps in the Ottoman front line, allowing the pursuing Desert Mounted Corps to encircle the infantry fighting in the Judean Hills and fight the Battle of Nazareth and Battle of Samakh, capturing Afulah, Beisan, Jenin and Tiberias. In the process the EEF destroyed three Ottoman armies during the Battle of Sharon, the Battle of Nablus and the Third Transjordan attack, capturing thousands of prisoners and large quantities of equipment. Damascus and Aleppo were captured during the subsequent pursuit, before the Ottoman Empire agreed to the Armistice of Mudros on 30 October 1918, ending the Sinai and Palestine campaign. The British Mandate of Palestine (1920–1948) and the Mandate for Syria and the Lebanon were created to administer the captured territories.

The campaign was generally not well known or understood during the war. In Britain, the public thought of it as a minor operation, a waste of precious resources which would be better spent on the Western Front, while the peoples of India were more interested in the Mesopotamian campaign and the occupation of Baghdad. Australia did not have a war correspondent in the area until Captain Frank Hurley, the first Australian Official Photographer, arrived in August 1917 after visiting the Western Front. Henry Gullett, the first Official War Correspondent, arrived in November 1917.

The long-lasting effect of this campaign was the partition of the Ottoman Empire, when France won the mandate for Syria and Lebanon, while the British Empire won the mandates for Mesopotamia and Palestine. The Republic of Turkey came into existence in 1923 after the Turkish War of Independence ended the Ottoman Empire. The European mandates ended with the formation of the Kingdom of Iraq in 1932, the Lebanese Republic in 1943, the Hashemite Kingdom of Transjordan and Syrian Republic in 1946, and the State of Israel in 1948.

== Background ==
Since 1805, Egypt had been a de facto independent state under the Muhammad Ali Dynasty, though it remained de jure part of the Ottoman Empire. The United Kingdom's occupation of Egypt from 1882 severely curtailed Egypt's de facto independence, but did not alter its legal status, with the Egyptian Khedive technically remaining a vassal of the Ottoman Sultan. Seeking to end the British occupation of the country, Khedive Abbas II sided with the Ottoman Empire upon the latter's entry into the First World War on the side of the Central Powers. This prompted the United Kingdom to depose Abbas, terminate the obsolete legal fiction of Ottoman sovereignty over Egypt, and declare the re-establishment of the Sultanate of Egypt, with Hussein Kamel, uncle of the deposed Khedive, as Sultan. The sultanate was to be administered as a British protectorate, with all matters pertinent to the war effort controlled exclusively by the United Kingdom.

The Suez Canal was of vital strategic importance to the British, reducing the sailing time from India, New Zealand and Australia to Europe. As a result Egypt became a major base during the war, particularly during the Gallipoli campaign. To Germany and the Ottoman Empire the canal was the closest and weakest link in British communications. Defence of the canal posed a number of problems, with its sheer size alone making it hard to control. There was no road from Cairo, while only one railway track crossed the 30 miles (48 km) of desert from Cairo to Ismaïlia on the canal before branching north to Port Said and south to Suez. Control of the central area around Ismaïlia was of great strategic importance because these three canal towns relied on fresh water from the Nile via the Sweet Water Canal to the main gates and sluices near there.

At the beginning of hostilities between Britain and the Ottoman Empire in November 1914, the 30,000-strong British defence force evacuated the part of the Sinai Peninsula that was east of the canal, concentrating their defences on the western side of the canal. The British force comprised the 10th, and 11th Indian Divisions, the Imperial Service Cavalry Brigade, the Bikaner Camel Corps, three batteries of Indian mountain artillery and one Egyptian artillery battery. These were supported by the guns of Allied ships in the canal. Opposing them were around 25,000 men, including the 25th Division. The Ottoman Empire demonstrated its interest in being reinstated in Egypt in 1915 when Ottoman forces attacked British forces in Egypt. The Germans also helped to foment unrest among the Senussi in what is now Libya, when they attacked western Egypt and threatened the Sudan during the Senussi campaign.

=== Egypt's contribution to the war effort ===
Egypt was neither an independent ally nor a member of the British Empire and as such held a unique position amongst the belligerents. The recently appointed High Commissioner Sir Reginald Wingate and Murray agreed that Egypt's contributions would be restricted to the use of the country's railway and Egyptian personnel. However, Maxwell had proclaimed on 6 November 1914 that Egypt would not be required to aid Britain's war effort. Martial law allowed the British administration to control foreign European residents, monitor foreign agents and intern dangerous persons who were the subjects of hostile nations. The powers were also used to police prostitution and the sale of alcohol. The Capitulations however, provided some protection to the Europeans who controlled both these industries. In the autumn of 1917 GHQ was transferred from Cairo to the front leaving garrison battalions. This move took the commander in chief of the EEF, who was responsible for martial law, out of touch with the civil authorities, and unrest in Egypt became serious during the winter of 1917/18.

By 1917, 15,000 Egyptian volunteers were serving in the Egyptian Army, deployed mainly in the Sudan with three battalions in the EEF, along with 98,000 labourers, 23,000 of whom were serving overseas. The number of Egyptian enlistments could not be increased as conscription could threaten the production of much needed food and cotton and the stability of Egypt. Also by this time, much of the railway lines in Egypt that were not crucial to the production of cotton, sugar, cereals and forages, had already been lifted and used on the military railway, except the Khedivial Railway from Alexandria to Dabaa which was available for emergencies. The Egyptian Labour Corps and the Egyptian Camel Transport Corps had performed invaluable service during the Sinai campaign and would perform even greater service and hardships during the coming Palestine campaign. As the war dragged on and the fighting moved beyond the Egyptian border, many Egyptians felt the war no longer concerned them. At the same time the increasing need for Egyptian personnel turned volunteers into forced labour, although "highly paid," in a system controlled by the local mudirs.

== Defence of the Suez Canal (1915–16) ==
From 26 January to 4 February 1915, the Suez Canal was attacked by a large force of the Ottoman Army. Beginning on 26 and 27 January, two smaller flanking columns of the Ottoman Army made secondary attacks near Kantara in the northern sector of the Canal and near Suez in the south. These were followed by the main attacks on 3 and 4 February, on the Suez Canal to east of the Suez to Kantara Railway. Kress von Kressenstein's Ottoman Suez Expeditionary Force advanced from Southern Palestine to arrive on the Canal on 2 February when they succeeded in crossing the Canal near Ismailia on the morning of 3 February 1915.

Only two Ottoman companies successfully crossed the canal, the rest of the advance party abandoning attempts to cross as a result of the strong British defence by 30,000 men of the Imperial Service Cavalry Brigade and the Bikaner Camel Corps supported by Egyptian Army and Indian mountain artillery. The British then amassed troops at the scene which made another crossing impossible. The Ottoman companies held their positions until the evening of 3 February 1915, when the commanding officer ordered them to withdraw. The retreat proceeded "orderly, first into a camp ten km east of Ismailia".

Subsequently, Ottoman advance troops and outposts were maintained on the Sinai peninsula on a line between El Arish and Nekhl, with forces at Gaza and Beersheba. During the next few months Kress von Kressenstein commanded mobile units and launched a series of raids and attacks in an attempt to disrupt traffic on the Suez Canal.

Colonel Kress von Kressenstein did all he could to keep the British occupied, launching an attack on 8 April 1915 when a mine was placed in the Suez Canal, which was located and disabled by a patrol, and between 5 and 13 May 1915 he personally led a charge. During the Gallipoli campaign these tactics were abandoned. Von Kressenstein also demanded German special forces, which were promised to arrive in February 1916, to prepare another expedition against the Canal. He moved to the headquarters of the Fourth Army in Ain Sofar in August, then to the new headquarters in Jerusalem, and waited for the German specialists. However, the Ottoman line of communication was extended towards Egypt, with the completion of the 100-mile (160 km) section of the Ottoman railway to Beersheba, which was opened on 17 October 1915.

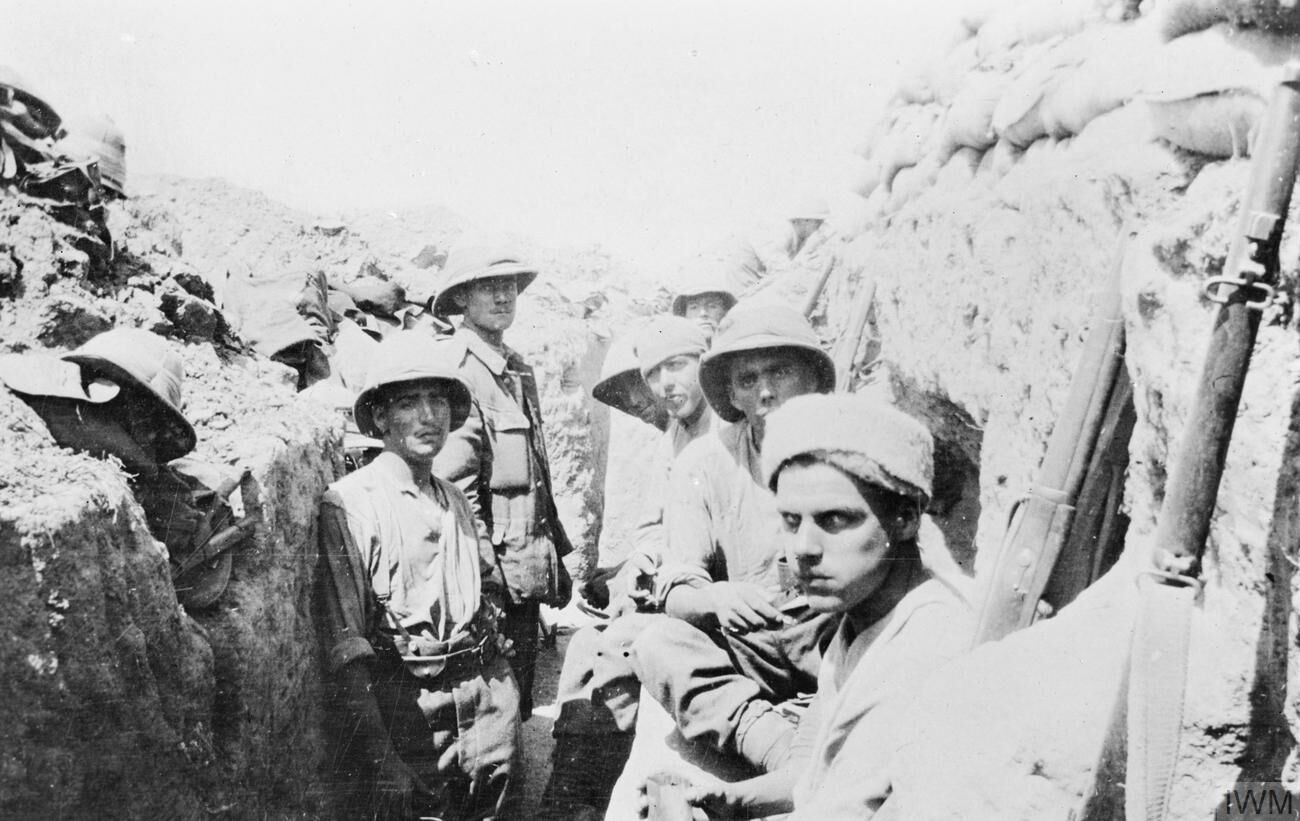
1st Herts. Yeomanry in the Suez Canal trenches, 1915

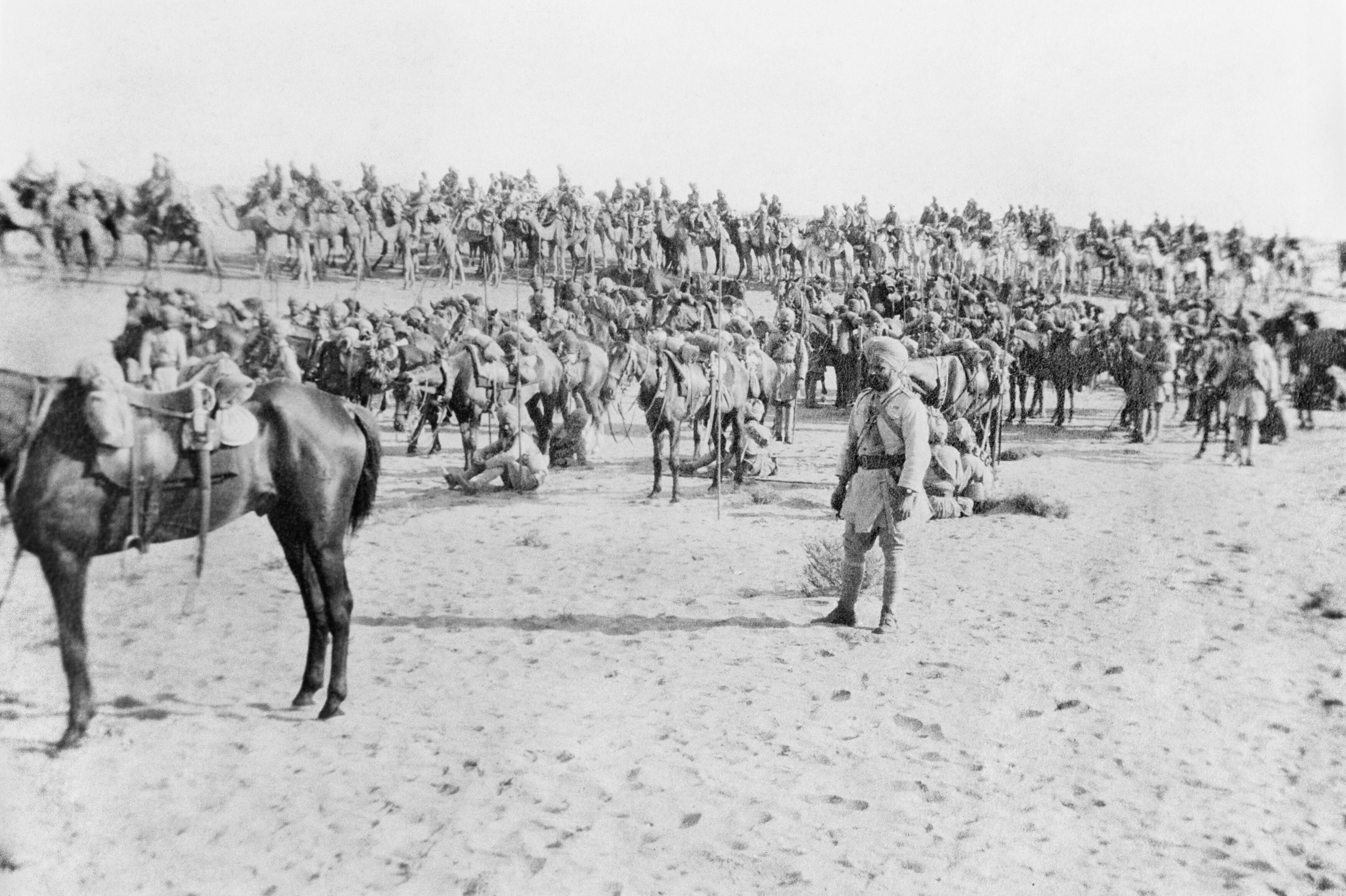
Mysore and Bengal Lancers with Bikanir Camel Corps in the Sinai Desert 1915.

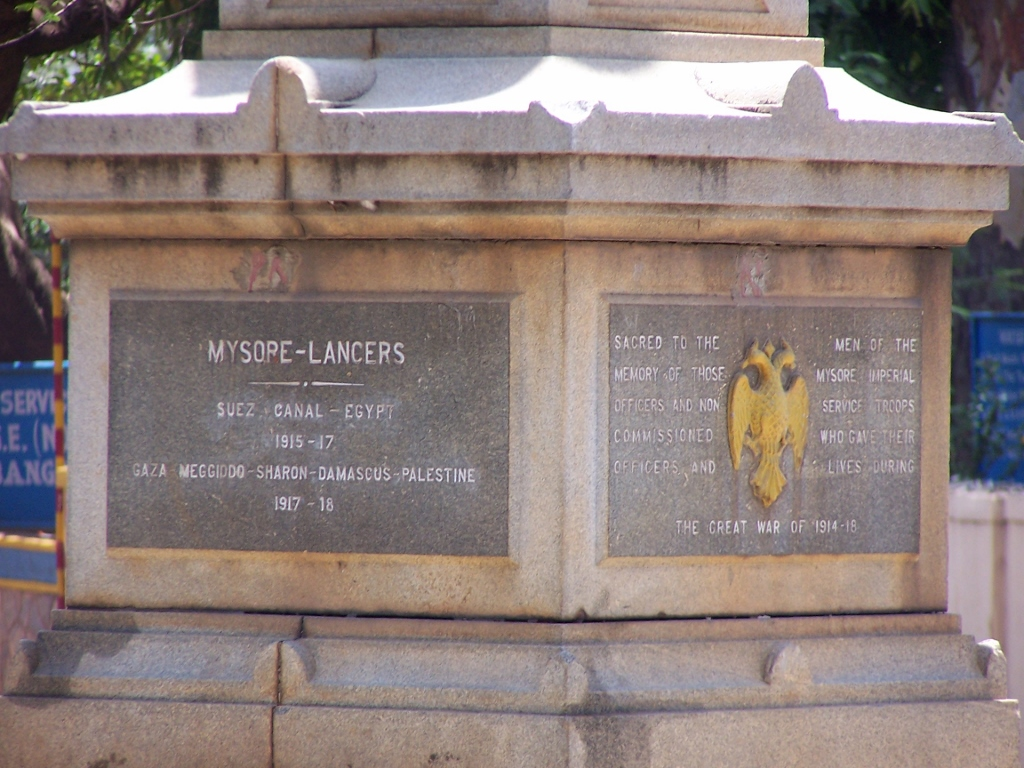
Mysore Lancers Memorial at Bangalore for lives lost in Suez & Palestine

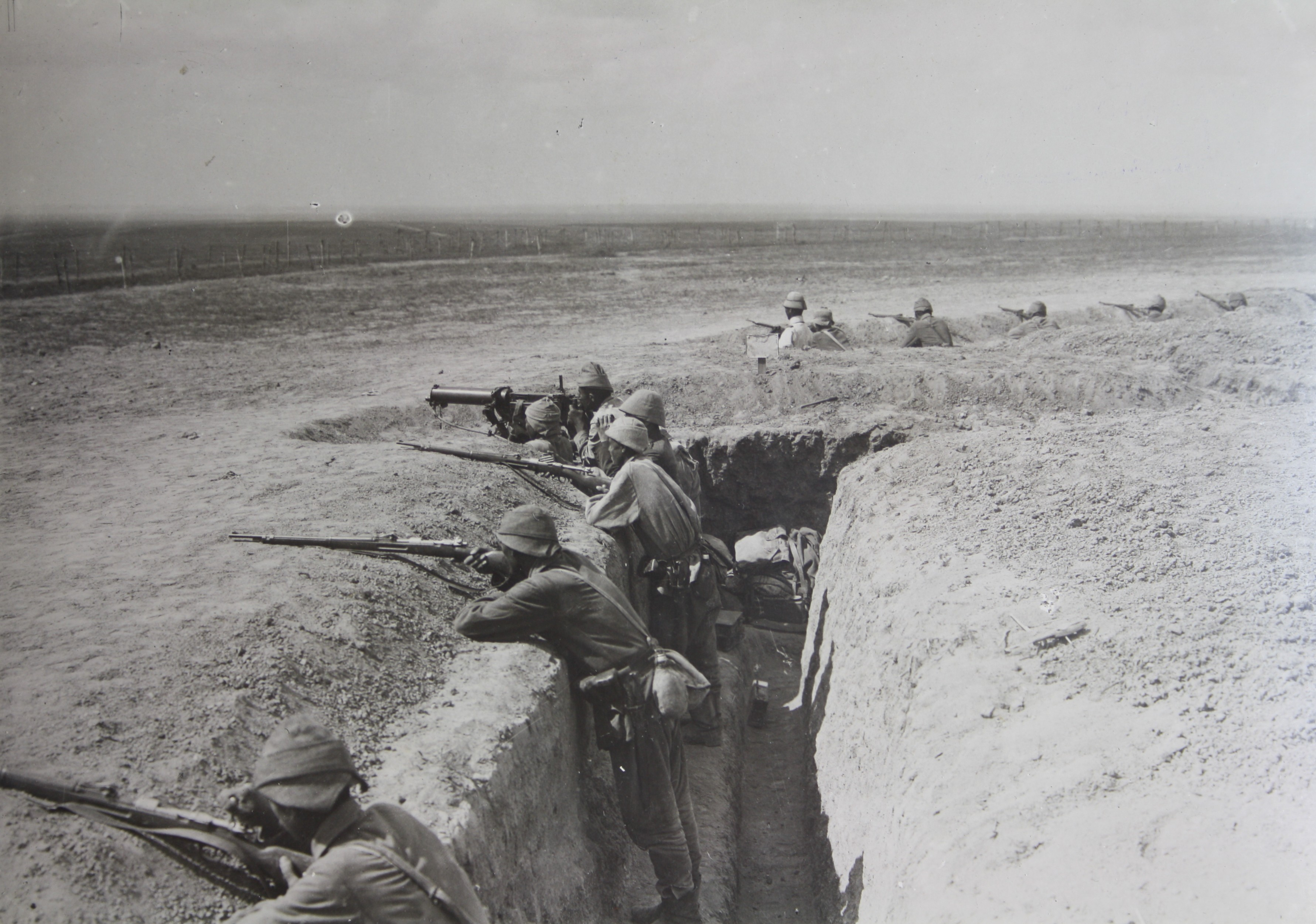
Ottoman soldiers in the trenches.

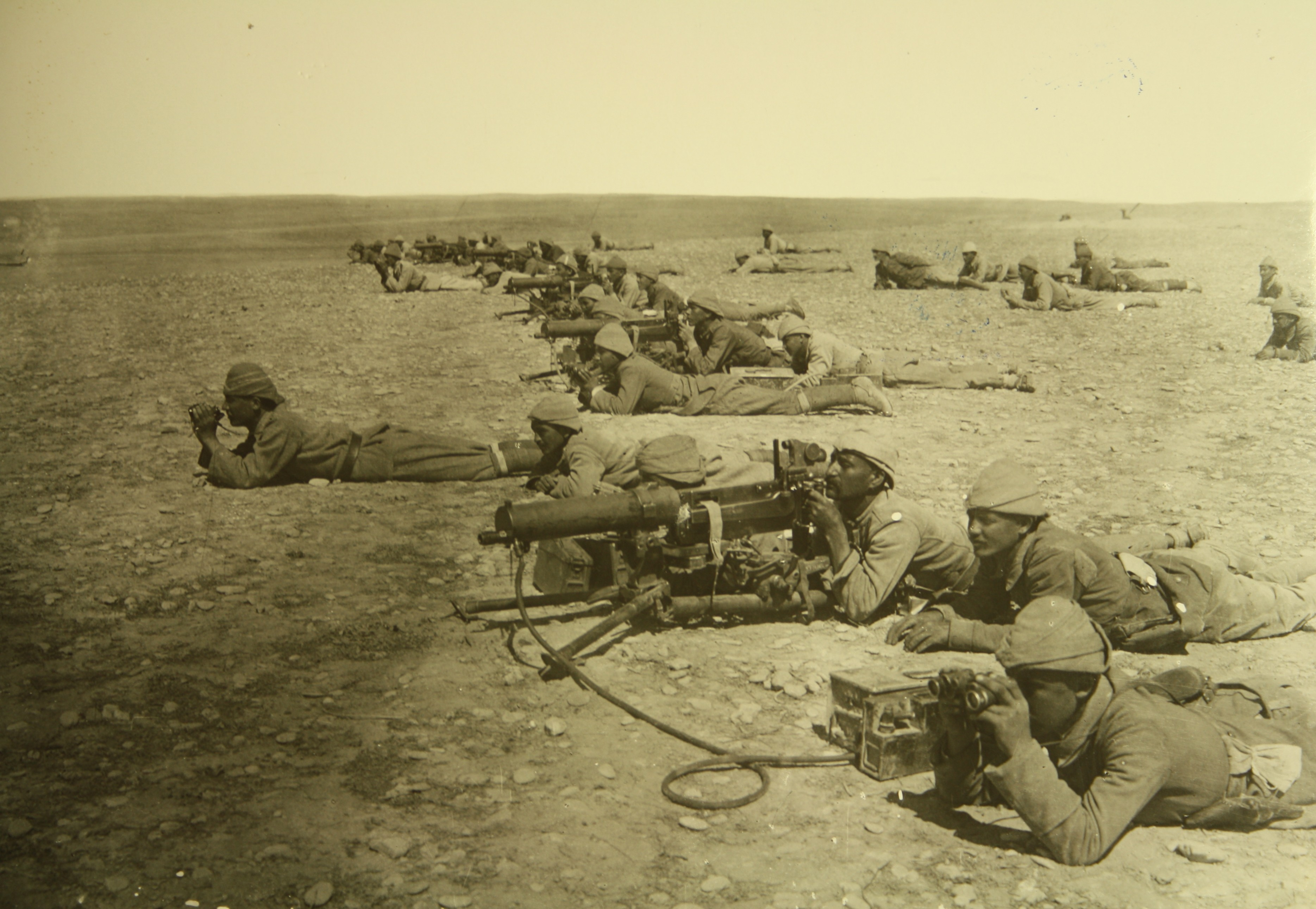
Ottoman soldiers with machine gun

=== British defences extended ===
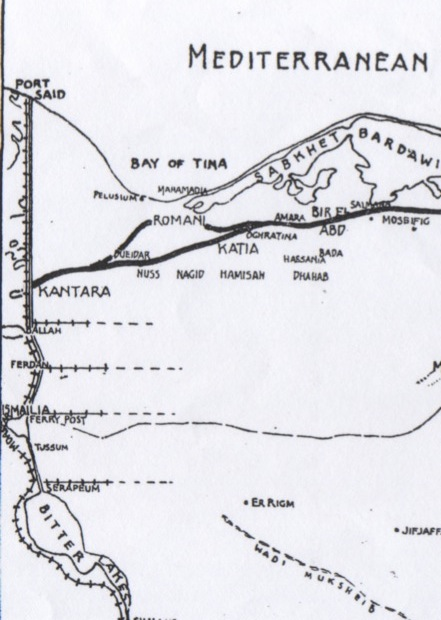
Map of improved defences

Von Kressenstein's raids confirmed the impracticality identified by Lord Kitchener, Secretary of State for War, in November 1914, of defending the Suez Canal from the western side. Near the end of 1915, with the Gallipoli campaign drawing to an end, Cabinet authorised new positions to be established in the desert about 11,000 yards (10 km) east of the Canal, strengthening defence of the canal against long range guns, and agreed to provide additional troops.

Port Said became headquarters of these new defences, with an advanced headquarters at Kantara. The defences were organised into three sectors:

- No. 1 (Southern): Suez to Kabrit HQ Suez – IX Corps
- No. 2 (Central): Kabrit to Ferdan HQ Ismailia – I ANZAC Corps (Australian and New Zealand Army Corps)
- No. 3 (Northern): Ferdan to Port Said – XV Corps

At the end of 1915 General Sir John Maxwell, with headquarters at Cairo, had responsibility for troops in the Egyptian Delta, the Western Desert and the Sudan and administered martial law over the whole region including the Suez Canal. The British War Office controlled the Levant Base which was responsible for administering British Empire forces in Salonika, Gallipoli, Mesopotamia and India, and had its headquarters at Alexandria. The retreating forces on Gallipoli and divisions from the United Kingdom formed the Mediterranean Expeditionary Force commanded by Lieutenant General Sir Archibald Murray with headquarters at Ismailia. After the evacuation from Gallipoli the total British force in Egypt was nearly 400,000 men in 13 infantry and mounted divisions, a force regarded as the strategic reserve for the whole Empire. In March 1916, Sir Archibald Murray took command of all these forces which were united into the new Egyptian Expeditionary Force.

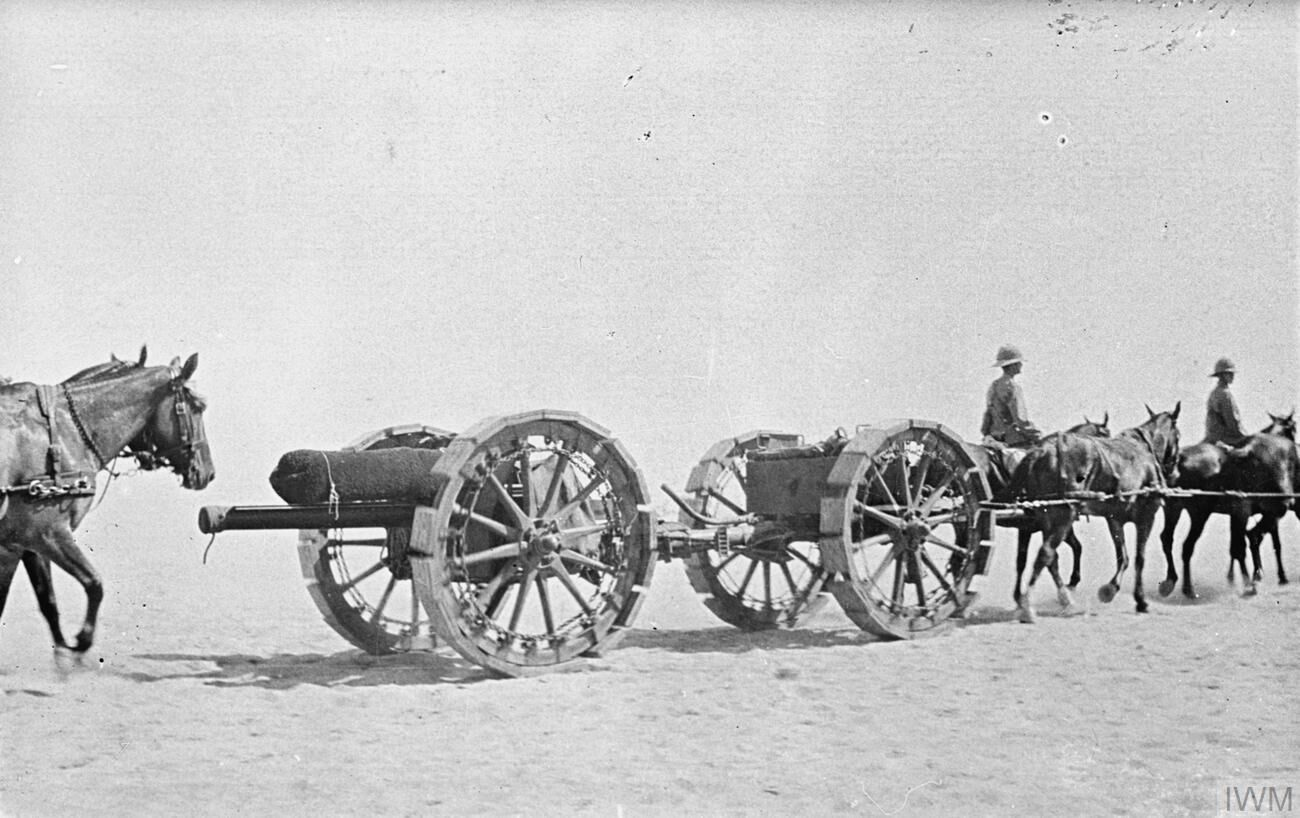
18-pounder gun with sand wheels, Suez Canal Defences 1916

Murray believed a British advance into the Sinai to occupy Qatiya/Katia would be more cost effective than the static defences recently established. The War Office agreed to this, but not to his more ambitious plan to advance to the Ottoman border. He believed that the area captured in an advance to El Arish or Rafa could be held with fewer troops than would be needed for a passive defence of the Suez Canal. Murray had estimated a force of 250,000 could cross the Sinai and that 80,000 troops could be maintained in the Katia area. If such a large Ottoman force were to reach Katia then the British would need a very large force to defend the Suez Canal. (Note: War Office policy in March 1916 was to withdraw as many troops as possible from Salonika, remain disengaged in the Balkans, keep Egypt secure and 'to keep a reserve in Egypt for India as long as it seems likely to be required' and get everyone else to France. [Bruce 2002, pp. 35–6]) British occupation of the oasis area which stretched eastwards from Romani and Katia to Bir el Abd along the ancient silk road would deny drinking water to any Ottoman invasion force.

Murray planned a 50,000-strong garrison in the Katia area and obtained authority to build a pipeline to pump fresh Nile water and a railway to transport the infantry divisions and their supplies. He also decided to empty the water cisterns at Moya Harab so the central Sinai route could not again be used by Ottoman columns advancing from Palestine and to maintain some troops at Suez to defend the town. These operations began in February 1916 when construction started on the 25 miles (40 km) stretch of 4-foot 8 inch standard gauge Sinai railway and water pipeline from Qantara/Kantara to Qatiya/Katia. By the end of March or early in April 16 miles (26 km) of track, including sidings, had been laid.

=== Raid on Jifjafa ===
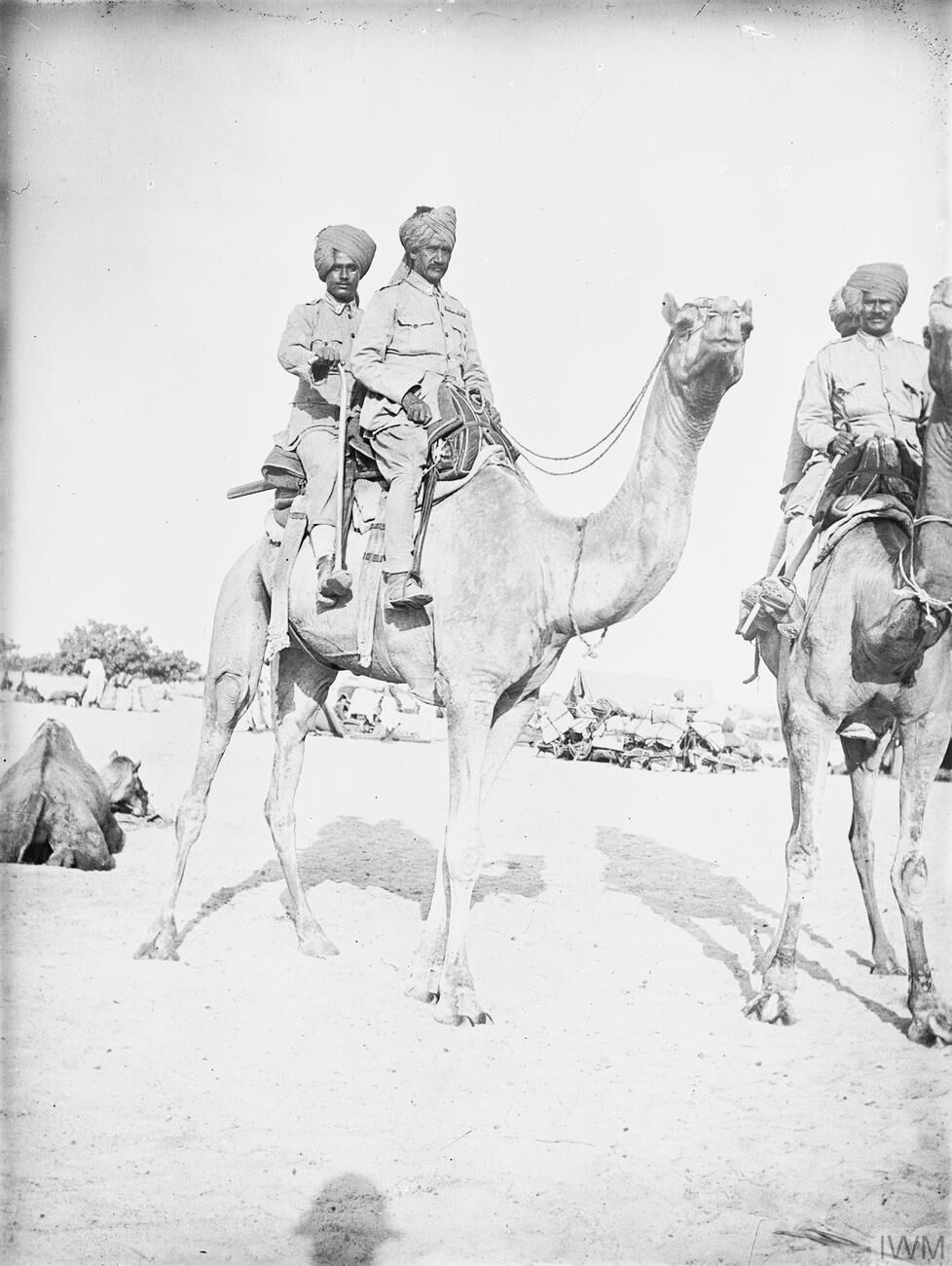
Bikaner Camel Corps, El Arish 1918

The intact water cistern and wells on the central road across Sinai still enabled Ottoman Army forces to threaten the Canal at any time. Between 11 and 15 April, 25 Bikaner Camel Corps, 10 Engineers with 12 men from 8th Light Horse Regiment and 117 men from 9th Light Horse Regiment (30 light horsemen armed as Lancers), with 127 Egyptian Camel Transport Corps travelled 52 miles (84 km) to destroy a well-boring plant, gyns erected on the wells, the water wells and pumping equipment at Jifjafa. They captured an Austrian engineer officer and 33 men, four of whom were wounded, and killed six Ottoman soldiers. On 9 June 1916 units from No. 2 Section of the Canal Defences formed the Mukhsheib column, consisting of part of the 3rd Light Horse Brigade, 900 camels, non-fighting units and camel transport escorted by one squadron of 9th Light Horse Regiment and 10 Bikaner Camel Corps. The engineers drained pools and cisterns of five million gallons of water in the Wadi Mukhsheib, sealed the cisterns to prevent them refilling during next season's rains and returned on 14 June. At the same time a detachment of Middlesex Yeomanry advanced to Moiya Harab. With the central Sinai route now denied to them, Ottoman forces could only advance towards the Suez Canal along the northern coast.

=== Occupation of Romani ===
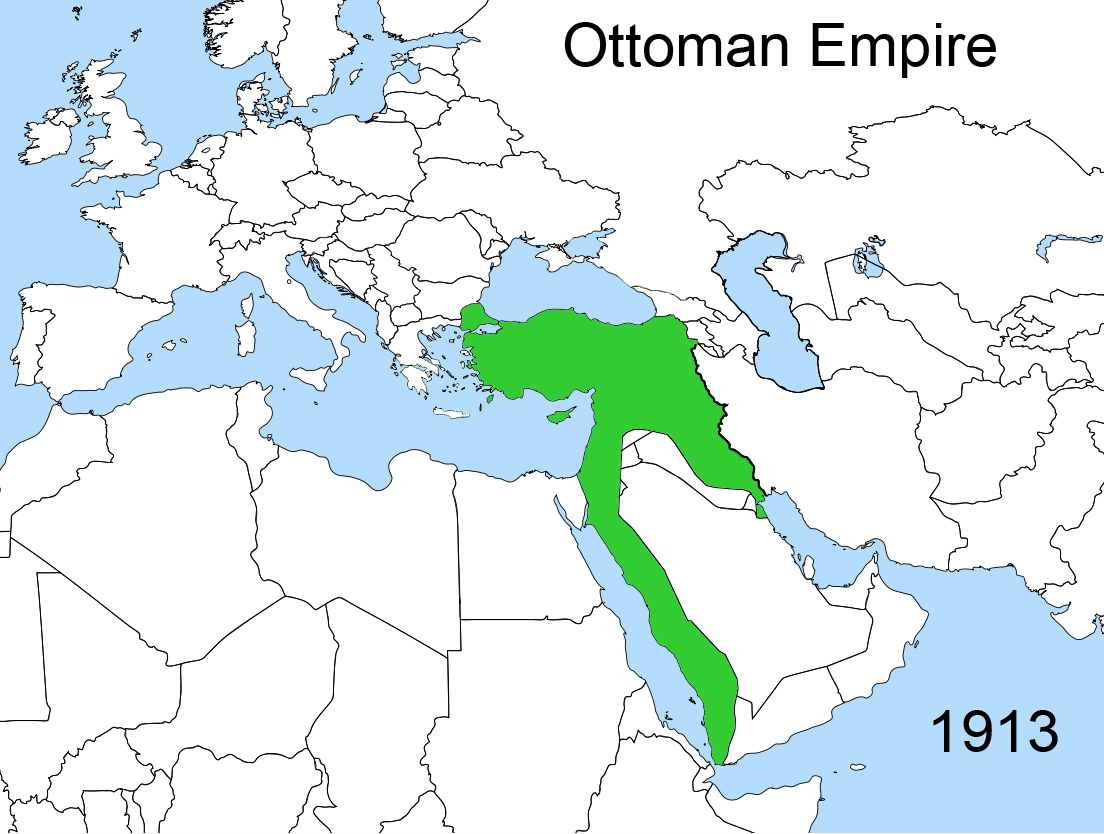
Ottoman Empire in 1913 (in green)

Kress von Kressenstein launched a surprise attack on Easter Sunday, also Saint George's Day, 23 April 1916, east of the Canal and north of El Ferdan Station. The yeomanry 5th Mounted Brigade were guarding the water pipeline and railway being built out into the desert towards Romani. While the three regiments were widely dispersed, squadrons were surprised and overwhelmed at Katia and Oghratina, east of Romani, suffering the loss of about two squadrons.

Fighting for the oases area during a raid on Katia and Oghratina demonstrated its importance to both sides. From a base in the oases a large number of Ottoman troops could threaten the Suez Canal, and control the Sinai Peninsula with the threat of a flank attack. The Australian 2nd Light Horse Brigade and New Zealand Mounted Rifles Brigades of Major General Harry Chauvel's Australian and New Zealand Mounted Division (Anzac Mounted Division) were ordered to occupy the Romani area the day after the fighting at Katia and Oghratina. Here, 23 miles (37 km) from Kantara, they aggressively patrolled and reconnoitred the area. The Australian 1st Light Horse Brigade arrived at Romani on 28 May 1916.

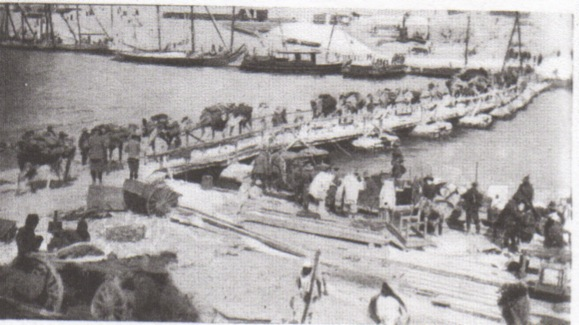
New Zealand Mounted Rifle Brigade transport crossing Pontoon Bridge at Serapeum 6 March 1916

Until the railway and water pipeline to Pelusium Station and Romani were built, all water, food (mainly bully beef and biscuits, as packing and transport methods did not allow fresh meat and vegetables), shelters, other equipment and ammunition had to be carried to this position by the Egyptian Camel Transport Corps. With flies attracted to horse litter, etc., provision of safe sanitation was a constant battle. Incinerators were constructed to burn refuse by stacking used bully beef tins filled with sand. During this period men had to patrol constantly despite poor diet, severe weather conditions, little shelter from the sun and very few rest periods.

[In] April 1916 – Everything is being hurried up. The big English flying school near our camp has been ordered to turn out as many pilots as quickly as possible and there is an average of eighteen planes in the air all day long, just over our heads. The din is indescribable, but the horses never look up, or otherwise take the slightest notice of the planes. The life of a pilot, computed in flying hours, is pitifully short; many of them are killed while learning. My wife is working as voluntary aid at a hospital in Ismailia, and she and her associates are constantly making shrouds for these boys that have perhaps made one little mistake in their first solo flight, and have paid for it with their lives. The army will do anything in reason for these youngsters. We are ordered to let them have riding–horses and we occasionally turn out quite a creditable hunt with Saluki hounds after jackals.

— A. B. Paterson, Remounts Officer

During May 1916 Ottoman aircraft flew over the Suez Canal dropping bombs on Port Said which caused 23 casualties. On 18 May, the Ottoman occupied town and aerodrome at El Arish was bombed by order of Colonel W.G.H. Salmond, commander of the 5th Wing, in reprisal for the first Ottoman raids, and on 22 May the Royal Flying Corps bombed all camps on a 45-mile (72 km) front parallel to the canal. By the middle of May the railway had been completed to Romani, making it possible to bring up enough stores and equipment to deploy the 52nd (Lowland) Division there. As soon as they arrived they began to dig trenches in the sand, creating a defensive line with redoubts from Mahemdia near the Mediterranean coast, south to Katib Gannit a high point in front of Romani.

Ottoman Army units retaliated to the increased British Empire presence at the beginning of June, with the first of many air raids on Romani killing eight troopers from the 1st Light Horse Brigade and wounding 22. About 100 horses were also lost. At this time the forward Ottoman air base was at Bir el Mazar, 42 miles (68 km) east of Romani.

=== Sinai reconnaissances May and June 1916 ===
Early reconnaissances by the ANZAC Mounted Division covered considerable distances from Romani as far as Oghratina, to Bir el Abd and Bir Bayud. The longest raid was made on 31 May 1916 by the New Zealand Mounted Rifle Brigade to Salmana, covering 100 kilometres (62 mi) in 36 hours.

After the middle of May and in particular from mid June to the end of July the heat in the Sinai desert ranged from extreme to fierce. Even worse for the British were the Khamsin dust storms which blow once every 50 days for a few hours or several days, turning the atmosphere into a haze of floating sand particles flung about by a hot southerly wind. The ANZAC troops and their commanders, unused to the conditions, suffered considerably from heatstroke and thirst during these early patrols. One such patrol, returning during the hottest part of the day after a sleepless night far from base, and very little water, suffered casualties of 160 men who collapsed from heat exhaustion.

An important innovation in the getting of water, which enabled the mounted units to operate more effectively over wide areas of rocky desert areas and sand dunes on reconnaissance, was the Spear Point, developed by Australian Engineers designed to be attached to a pump:

A 2 ½ inch pipe was pointed, perforated and covered with a sheet of fine perforated brass. This was driven down into the water area by means of a small pulley bar and monkey, or by a sledge–hammer; and additional lengths of pipe were added if necessary. The ordinary General Service "Lift and Force Pump" was then attached. This arrangement proved so efficient that "Spear Points" were issued to every Squadron in the Division, and the RE Troops carried a number of them. Our men were thus enabled to get water at any of the hods in the desert in a very short space of time. [sic]

Once the brackish water was found, a medical officer assessed it as either drinking water, horse water or not fit for horses, and signs were erected.

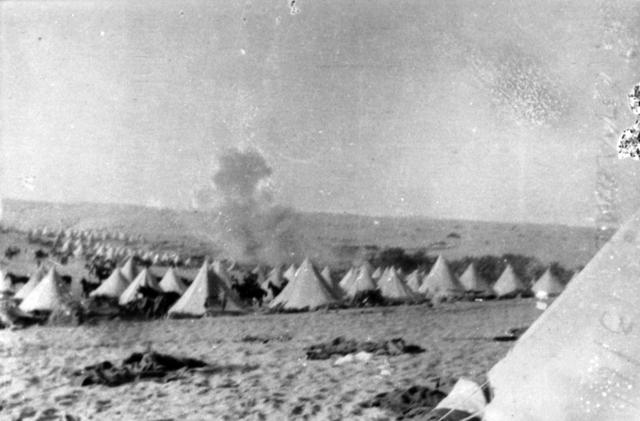
Romani 1 June 1916 bombs falling on B Squadron, 3rd Light Horse Regiment, 1st Light Horse Brigade tent lines 8 men killed 22 wounded, 36 horses killed 9 wounded, 123 missing

In June, the 1st Light Horse Brigade carried out reconnaissances to Bir Bayud, Sagia and Oghratina, to Bir el Abd, Hod el Ge'eila, Hod um el Dhauanin and Hod el Mushalfat. Another routine reconnaissance by 2nd Light Horse Brigade took place on 9 July to El Salmana. Just ten days later, El Salmana was occupied by Ottoman Army units as they concentrated for the Battle of Romani.

In the middle of June the No. 1 Squadron, Australian Flying Corps began active service with "B" Flight at Suez doing reconnaissance work and on 9 July "A" Flight was stationed at Sherika in Upper Egypt with "C" Flight based at Kantara.

=== Battle of Romani ===
The battle of Romani took place near the Egyptian town of that name 23 miles (37 km) east of the Suez Canal, from shortly after midnight on 3/4 August until the invading force retired during the late morning and afternoon of 5 August. The Central Powers force of Austrians, Germans and Ottomans, led by Kress von Kressenstein, sought to stop the British Empire reclaiming the Egyptian territory of the Sinai Peninsula and cut the Suez Canal by bringing it within artillery range. It numbered 12,000, mainly from the 3rd Infantry Division, with Bedouin irregulars, German machine-gunners and Austrian artillery from Pasha 1. Romani was defended by the 52nd (Lowland) Division, and the 1st, and 2nd Light Horse Brigades. The canal was defended by the 5th Mounted, the New Zealand Mounted Rifles Brigades and the 5th Light Horse Regiment.

Sustained fighting began in the early hours and by about 11:00 on 4 August, the Austrian, German and Ottoman force had pushed the two Australian brigades back to a point where the 52nd (Lowland) Division in their trenches were able to attack the attackers' right flank, and the New Zealand Mounted Rifle and 5th Mounted Brigades arrived in time to extend the Australian Light Horse's line. The Ottoman advance was stopped by the combined Allied fire from the infantry and mounted troops, deep sand, the mid summer mid day heat and thirst. In mid summer desert conditions, the British infantry were unable to move effectively to pursue the retreating columns the next day and alone, the Anzac Mounted Division was unable to attack and capture Von Kressenstein's large force which made an orderly retreat to Katia and eventually back to their base at Bir el Abd. Bir el Abd was abandoned on 12 August 1916 after fierce fighting, during an attack by the Anzac Mounted Division on 9 August, at the extremity of British Empire lines of communication. This was the first substantial Allied victory against the Ottoman Empire in World War I, ending the Defence of the Suez Canal campaign. The Canal was never again threatened by land forces during the remainder of the war. The Allies then went on the offensive for seven months, pushing the Ottoman Army back across the Sinai Peninsula, fighting the Battles of Magdhaba and Rafa before being stopped on Ottoman soil in southern Palestine at the First Battle of Gaza in March 1917.

== Arab Revolt ==
In early June 1916, the Sharifian Army of Sherif Hussein, Amir of Mecca, launched attacks on the Ottoman garrisons in Mecca and Jeddah in the south western Arabian Peninsula. Jeddah fell quickly allowing the Royal Navy to use the port. Fighting in Mecca lasted three weeks. A large Ottoman garrison held out at Taif until late September when they capitulated, while Sherif Hussein's third son Feisal attacked the Ottoman garrison at Medina. The British were keen to extend the Arab Revolt by destabilizing sections of the Ottoman Empire through which the Hejaz Railway ran north – south, from Istanbul to Damascus and on to Amman, Maan, Medina and to Mecca. The railway, built with German assistance to carry pilgrims, was not only important for Ottoman communications but contained solidly-built stone station buildings which could form defensive positions. With the balance of power in northern Sinai moving in favour of the British, the Sherif was encouraged to seek support for his revolt from as far north as Baalbek, north of Damascus. In London, the War Office, hoping to foment unrest throughout the Ottoman Arab territories, encouraged Murray's plan to advance to El Arish.

== Sinai campaign of manoeuvre warfare ==
At the conclusion of the Battle of Romani on 12 August 1916, the Ottoman Army had been pushed back to its forward position at Bir el Abd, the last oasis in the series stretching from the Romani area. The Ottomans' main forward base was pushed back to El Arish, with a fortified advanced post at Bir el Mazar, where a small group of wells which reliably provided water. El Arish was the target of an air raid on 18 June 1916 by 11 aircraft of the 5th Wing under Colonel W. G. H. Salmond. The planes flew out to sea until east of El Arish, then turned inland to approach from the southeast. Two Ottoman aircraft on the ground and two of the ten aircraft hangars were set on fire; bombs hit four others and troops were also attacked. Three British aircraft were forced to land, one in the sea.

The Egyptian Expeditionary Force required huge amounts of ammunition and supplies and a reliable source of water for an advance to El Arish. To provide this, the British Royal Engineers built a railway and pipeline across the Sinai Peninsula to El Arish under the leadership of Brigadier-General Everard Blair. From the middle of August to the Battle for Magdhaba on 23 December 1916, British forces waited for this necessary infrastructure to be put in place. These four months have often been described as a period of rest for the Anzac Mounted Division as there were no major battles. However, the mounted troops were busy providing screens for the construction, patrolling newly occupied areas and carrying out reconnaissances to augment aerial photographs to improve maps of the newly occupied areas.

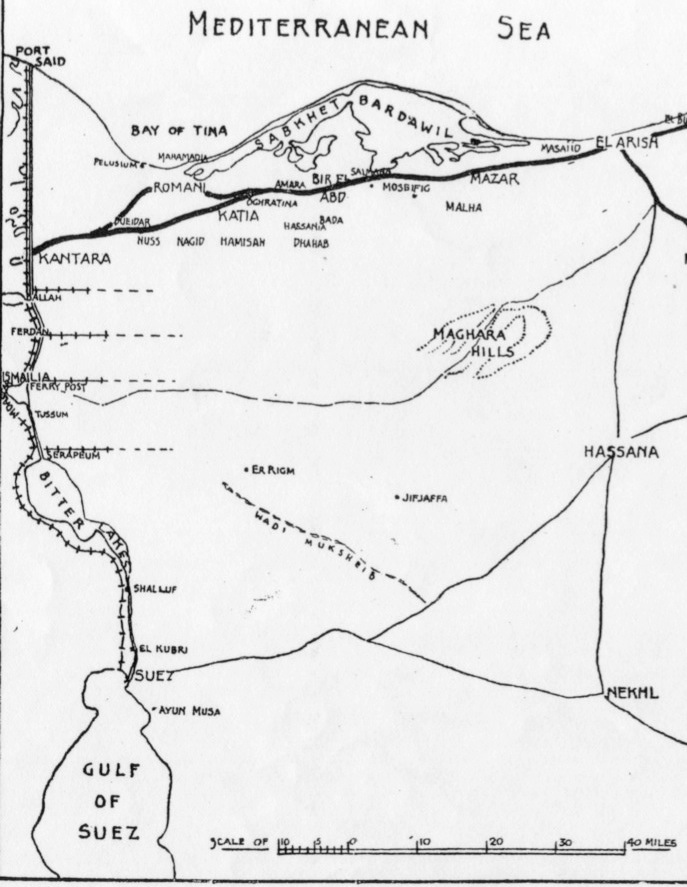
Suez Canal to El Arish

During one of the patrols, on 19 August, a group of 68 Ottoman soldiers was found half dead from thirst by the 5th Light Horse Regiment (2nd Light Horse Brigade) who, rather than attacking them, gave them water and their rides. The commanding officer and his men led the Ottoman Army soldiers on their horses for 5 miles (8.0 km) through deep sand until met by transport. "This was a very queer sight and worthy of a moving picture [of these] poor sacrifices of the Huns."

British infantry was brought forward to fortify and provide garrisons along the length of the railway. They formed a firm base for mobile operations and defence in depth for the huge administrative organisation advancing with the railway, in support of the Anzac Mounted Division and the 52nd (Lowland) Division. The movement of the infantry across Sinai was eased by construction of wire netting roads also used by Egyptian Labour Corps, light vehicles, cars, and ambulances. This reasonably stable surface, which did not sink, was constructed from two or four rolls of rabbit wire; one inch mesh wire rolled out side by side, wired together with the edges fixed into the sand with long steel or wooden pegs to produce a reasonable track.

Although the front had moved eastwards across the Sinai, it was still necessary to maintain defence units on the Canal. While serving as part of Canal Defence at Gebel Heliata, Serapeum, the 12th Light Horse Regiment commemorated 28 August: "Today being the Anniversary of the Regiment landing on Gallipoli, a little latitude was given to all hands, and an enjoyable evening was spent in the men's canteen." By September 1916, the German and Ottoman Empires had renegotiated their agreements to recognise the increasing Ottoman forces being deployed in Europe, while German and Austrian aid and equipment was increased to strengthen the Ottoman army in Palestine.

German aircrews of the Luftstreitkräfte bombed Port Said on 1 September 1916 and Australian and British airmen answered with a bombing raid on Bir el Mazar three days later, when twelve bombs silenced the anti-aircraft guns and blew several tents to pieces. Bir el Mazar was again bombed on 7 September. As part of the advance across the Sinai, the Australian Flying Squadron's "B" Flight moved their hangars from Suez forward to Mahemdia (4 miles from Romani) on 18 September; "C" Flight moved to Kantara on 27 September 1916.

=== Medical support ===
Advances in military medical techniques included the surgical cleaning (or debridement) of wounds, with delayed primary surgical closure, the Thomas Splint which stabilized compound leg fractures, the use of intravenous saline which had begun in 1916 and blood transfusions to prevent or even reverse the effects of shock. Casualties were transported from the regimental aid post close to the firing line to an advanced dressing station in the rear by the stretcher bearers of the field ambulances attached to the light horse and mounted brigades. Evacuations back to the railway line which stretched across the Sinai, were undertaken in horse-drawn ambulances, in sand sledges or in cacolets on camels, which was described as "a form of travel exquisite in its agony for wounded men because of the nature of the animal's movement".

=== Condition of the horses ===
There was a progressive improvement in horsemanship during the summer and autumn of 1916 indicated by the small number of animals evacuated from the Anzac Mounted Division after the strenuous marching and fighting from August after the Battle of Romani, during the capture of El Arish and the Battle of Magdaba. This improvement was augmented by regular inspections by administrative veterinary officers when the advice offered was followed by regimental commanders. During the year the average loss of sick horses and mules from the Sinai front was approximately 640 per week. They were transported in train loads of thirty trucks, each holding eight horses. Animals which died or were destroyed while on active service were buried 2 miles (3.2 km) from the nearest camp unless this was not practicable. In this case the carcasses were transported to suitable sites away from troops, where they were disembowelled and left to disintegrate in the dry desert air and high temperatures. Animals which died or were destroyed in veterinary units at Kantara, Ismalia, Bilbeis and Quesna were dealt with in this way and after four days' drying in the sun, the carcases were stuffed with straw and burnt, after the skins were salvaged and sold to local contractors.

=== Creation of Eastern Frontier Force ===
In September 1916, General Murray moved his headquarters from Ismailia on the Suez Canal back to Cairo in order to deal more efficiently with the threat from the Senussi in the Western Desert. General Lawrence was transferred to France where he served as Chief of Staff to Field Marshal Haig in 1918. Field Marshal William Robertson, the chief of the Imperial General Staff, set out his global military policy at this time in a letter to Murray of 16 October 1916, in which he stated "I am not intent on winning in any particular quarter of the globe. "My sole object is to win the war and we shall not do that in the Hedjaz nor in the Sudan. Our military policy is perfectly clear and simple ... [It] is offensive on the Western Front and therefore defensive everywhere else".

In this climate of defensive military policy, Major-General Sir Charles Dobell, who had acquired a reputation for sound work in minor operations, was promoted to the rank of lieutenant-general, given the title of GOC Eastern Frontier Force and put in charge of all the troops on the canal and in the desert. His headquarters was established at Ismailia and he began to organise his command into two parts, the Canal Defences and Desert Column. In October, Eastern Force began operations into the Sinai desert and on to the border of Palestine. Initial efforts were limited to building a railway and a waterline across the Sinai. The railway was constructed by the Egyptian Labour Corps at the rate of about 15 miles (24 km) a month and the British front moved eastward at the same speed. By 19 October the Anzac Mounted Division Headquarters was at Bir el Abd where the 52nd (Lowland) Division joined them on 24 October.

=== Raid on Bir el Mazar ===
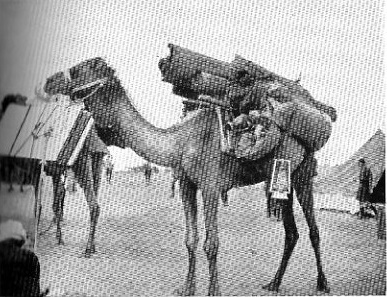
Brigade Headquarters Office Ready for the Road

A reconnaissance in force to Bir el Mazar was carried out by the 2nd and 3rd Light Horse Brigades, the 1st Battalion, of the Imperial Camel Corps Brigade (ICCB), the New Zealand Machine Gun Squadron and the ICCB's Hong Kong and Singapore Battery, on 16–17 September 1916. At the limit of their line of communication the light horse, infantry, machine guns and artillery were not able to capture the 2,000 strong, well entrenched garrison which made a determined stand. After demonstrating the strength of the advancing army, they successfully withdrew back to Anzac Mounted Division's Headquarters at Bir Sulmana 20 miles (32 km) to the west. The Ottoman force abandoned Bir el Mazar shortly after. The report of the 2nd Light Horse Brigade described their 5th Light Horse Regiment being fired on by anti-aircraft guns during the operations and reported one man killed and nine wounded. The 3rd Light Horse Brigade recorded that the troops of the Imperial Camel Corps Brigade and the artillery battery were unable to move quickly enough to take part in the attack, and their brigade lost three killed, three wounded and two injured. Airmen of No. 1 and No. 14 Squadrons confirmed anti-aircraft guns fired on the light horse, describing the ground engagement as so tough the Ottoman Army soldiers resorted to this extreme measure, turning their anti-aircraft guns away from the attacking planes. The Ottoman soldiers withdrew to the Wadi al-Arish, with garrisons at Lahfan and Magdhaba.

=== Raid on Maghara Hills ===
As the Allies advanced, an Ottoman-occupied position on the right flank at Bir El Maghara 50 miles (80 km) south east of Romani, began to be a threat to their advance. Major-General A.G. Dallas was put in command of a column of 800 Australian Light Horse, 400 City of London Yeomanry, 600 Mounted Camelry and 4,500 camels from the Egyptian Camel Transport Corps, with another 200 camels for the Army Medical Corps. The column formed at Bayoud and moved off on 13 October on a two-night march via Zagadan and Rakwa to the Maghara Hills.

On arrival, A and C Squadrons of the 12th Light Horse Regiment deployed in the centre, with the 11th Light Horse Regiment on the right and the Yeomanry on the left flanks, dismounted at the foot of the hills. Handing over their lead horses in excellent cover these dismounted men then scaled the heights and surprised the defenders but failed to capture the main defensive position. The 11th Light Horse Regiment captured seven Ottoman prisoners and three Bedouins, retiring the way they came to base on 17 October and back to railhead Ferdan on the Suez Canal, on 21 October 1916.

=== Aerial bombing of Beersheba ===
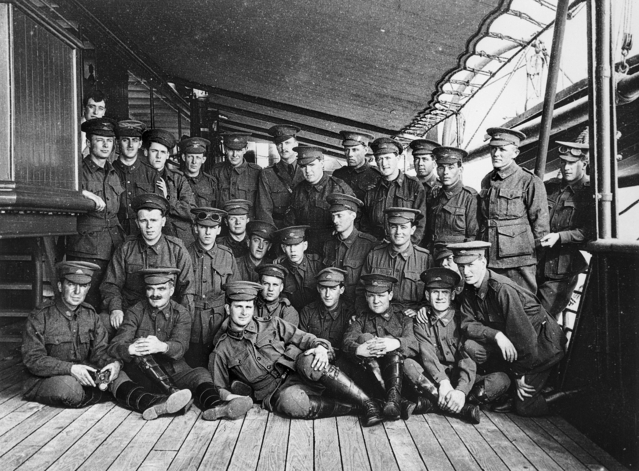
Reinforcements to No. 1 Squadron Australian Flying Corps on 25 July 1916 on board P & O "Malwa" on their way to Egypt

Subjected to further bombing air raids, by 2 October aerial reconnaissance photographs revealed the German aircraft hangars formerly at El Arish had disappeared. By 25 October there was no anti-aircraft fire reported over El Arish and reductions in the Ottoman–German force based there were apparent. By this time the railway construction was well past Salmana where a British forward aerodrome was under construction and No. 1 Squadron were involved in photographing the area around El Arish and Magdhaba, and No. 14 Squadron were reconnoitering Rafah.

On 11 November a Martinsyde and nine B.E.2c's, loaded with bombs and petrol, left the Kantara and Mahemdia aerodromes at dawn and assembled at Mustabig, just west of Bir el Mazar. There a raiding force of five B.E.2c's and the Martinsyde formed the largest force yet organised by Australians or any other air squadron in the East, filled up with petrol and bombs and set off in formation towards Beersheba. Over Beersheba the anti-aircraft guns engaged them with high explosive and shrapnel; the raiders flew through a flurry of white, black and green bursts. The Martinsyde dropped a 100 lb (45 kg) bomb fair in the centre of the aerodrome; two 20 lb (9.1 kg) bombs hit tents; others made direct hits on the railway to Beersheba and the station. A Fokker and an Aviatik took to the air but were driven off. After photographing Beersheba and the damage caused by the bombs, the airmen returned, reconnoitring Khan Yunis and Rafah on the way. All machines arrived safely, after having spent seven hours in flight. Two days later a German aeroplane retaliated by bombing Cairo.

=== Railway building: Sinai ===
On 17 November EEF railhead reached 8 miles (13 km) east of Salmana 54 miles (87 km) from Kantara, the water pipeline with its complex associated pumping stations built by Army Engineers and the Egyptian Labour Corps had reached Romani. Bir el Mazar, formerly the forward base of the Ottoman Army was taken over by the Anzac Mounted Division on 25 November 1916 the day before railhead. By 1 December the end of the most recently laid railway line was east of Mazar 64 miles (103 km) from Kantara. The Ottomans constructed a branch railway line running south from Ramleh, on the Jaffa–Jerusalem railway, to Beersheba, by relaying rails taken from the Jaffa–Ramleh line. German engineers directed the construction of stone ashlar bridges and culverts when the line was extended from Beersheba. It had almost reached the Wadi el Arish in December 1916 when Magdhaba was captured.

=== Battle of Magdhaba, December 1916 ===
On 21 December, after a night march of 30 miles (48 km), part of the Imperial Camel Corps Brigade and the Anzac Mounted Division commanded by Chauvel entered El Arish, which had been abandoned by the Ottoman forces, who retreated to Magdhaba.

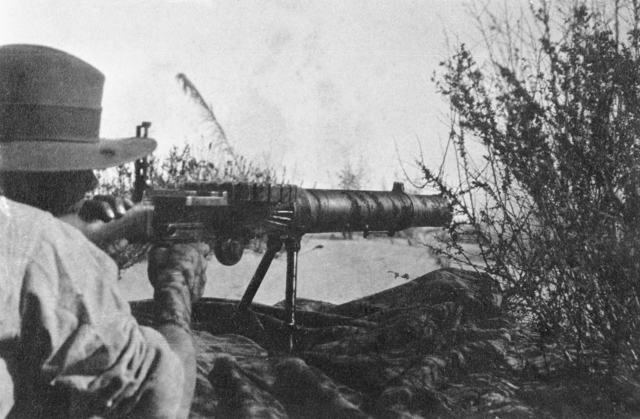
An Australian soldier firing a Lewis Gun during the Battle of Magdhaba

The Turkish outpost of Magdhaba was some 18 miles (29 km) to the southeast into the Sinai desert, from El Arish on the Mediterranean coast. It was the last obstacle to the Allied advance into Palestine.

The Desert Column under Chetwode also arrived that day. Chauvel, with the agreement of Chetwode, set out to attack the Turkish forces at Magdhaba with the Anzac Mounted Division. Leaving at about midnight on 22 December, the Anzac Mounted Division was in a position by 0350 on 23 December, to see Ottoman campfires still some miles away at Magdhaba.

With the 1st Light Horse Brigade in reserve, Chauvel sent the New Zealand Mounted Rifles Brigade and the 3rd Light Horse Brigade to move on Magdhaba by the north and north–east to cut off of retreat, while the Imperial Camel Corps Brigade followed the telegraph line straight on Magdhaba. The 1st Light Horse Brigade reinforced the Imperial Camel Corps Brigade in an attack on the redoubts, but fierce shrapnel fire forced them to advance up the wadi bed. By midday all three brigades and a section of the Camel Brigade, with Vickers and Lewis Gun sections and HAC artillery were engaged in fierce fighting. Aerial reconnaissance to scout out the Ottoman positions greatly assisted the attack, although the six redoubts were well camouflaged.

After tough fighting in the morning of 23 December, at about 13:00, Chauvel heard that the Turks still controlled most of the water in the area. It is claimed at this time that he decided to call off the attack. But at about the same time, after a telephone conversation between Chauvel and Chetwode, all British units attacked, and there was no doubt that the Turks were losing. Both the 1st Light Horse Brigade and the New Zealand Mounted Rifles Brigade made progress, capturing about 100 prisoners, and by 15:30 the Turks were beginning to surrender. By 16:30 the whole garrison had surrendered, having suffered heavy casualties, and the town was captured. The victory had cost the EEF 22 dead and 121 wounded.

=== Battle of Rafa, January 1917 ===
On the evening of 8 January 1917, mounted units of Desert Column including the Anzac Mounted Division, the Imperial Camel Corps Brigade, the 5th Mounted Yeomanry Brigade, No. 7 Light Car Patrol and artillery, rode out of El Arish to attack the next day 9 January, a 2,000 to 3,000-strong Ottoman Army garrison at El Magruntein also known as Rafa or Rafah.

Also on 9 January four British aircraft bombed the German aerodrome at Beersheba during the afternoon and in the evening, on the way back, saw a considerable Ottoman force near Weli Sheikh Nuran.

The British had reclaimed the northern section of the Egyptian Sinai Peninsula virtually to the frontier with the Ottoman Empire, but the new British government of David Lloyd George wanted more. The British Army in Egypt was ordered to go on the offensive against the Ottoman Army in part to support the Arab revolt which had started early in 1916, and to build on the momentum created by the victories won at Romani in August and Magdhaba in December 1916.

This next strategic objective was on the border of the British Protectorate of Egypt and the Ottoman Empire some 30 miles (48 km) distant, too far for infantry and so the newly formed Desert Column commanded by Chetwode was to attack the Ottoman position along the coast.

The Allied troops captured the town and the fortified position by nightfall with the loss of 71 killed and 415 wounded. The Ottoman garrison suffered heavily, with 200 killed and another 1,600 taken prisoner.

=== End of Sinai campaign ===
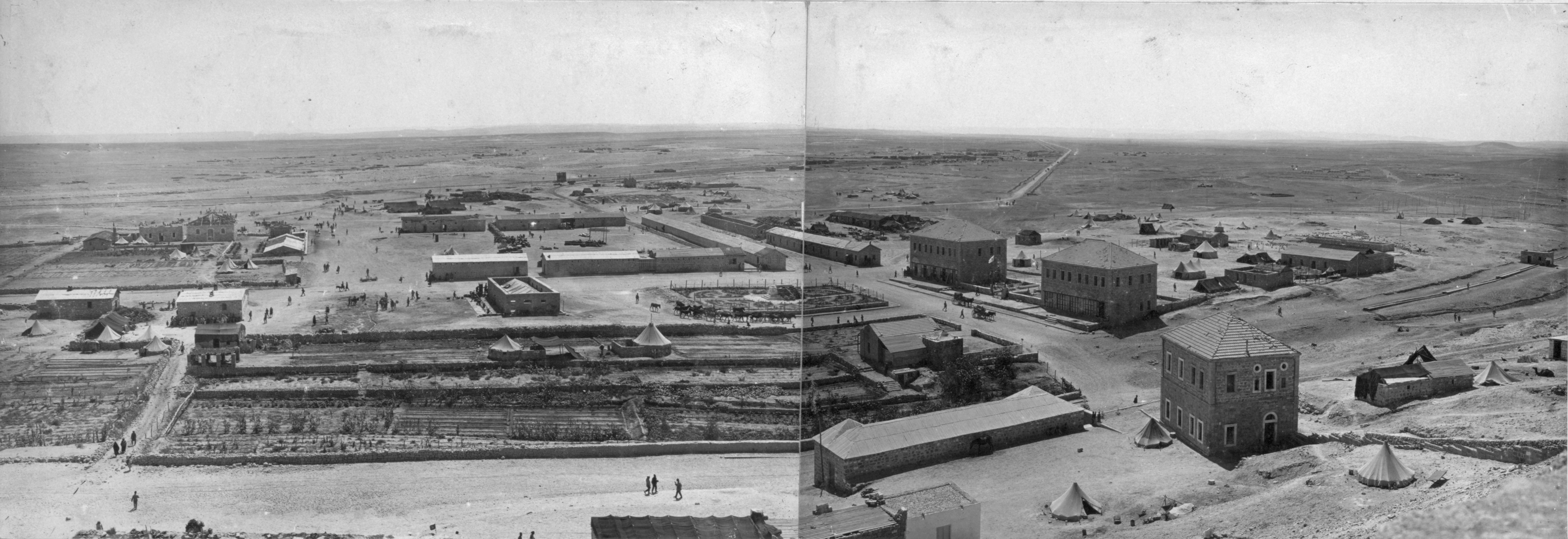
Ottoman military town of Hafir el Aujah, the principal desert base

The first signs of a major reorganisation of the Ottoman Army's defences were observed after the capture of El Arish and Battle of Magdhaba, on 28 December 1916 when reconnaissance planes found Ottoman forces moving their headquarters back. Days before the victory at Rafa, on 7 January air reconnaissance reported Ottoman forces still at El Auja and El Kossaima with the garrison at Hafir El Auja being slightly increased. But between 14 and 19 January Beersheba was bombed several times by No. 1 Squadron Australian Flying Corps in day and night raids; during one of these raids dropping twelve 20–lb. bombs directly on the biggest German hangar. After these raids the German airmen evacuated Beersheba and moved their aerodrome to Ramleh. And on 19 January air reconnaissance reported the Ottoman Army had evacuated El Kossaima and were in decreased strength at the major desert base at El Auja.

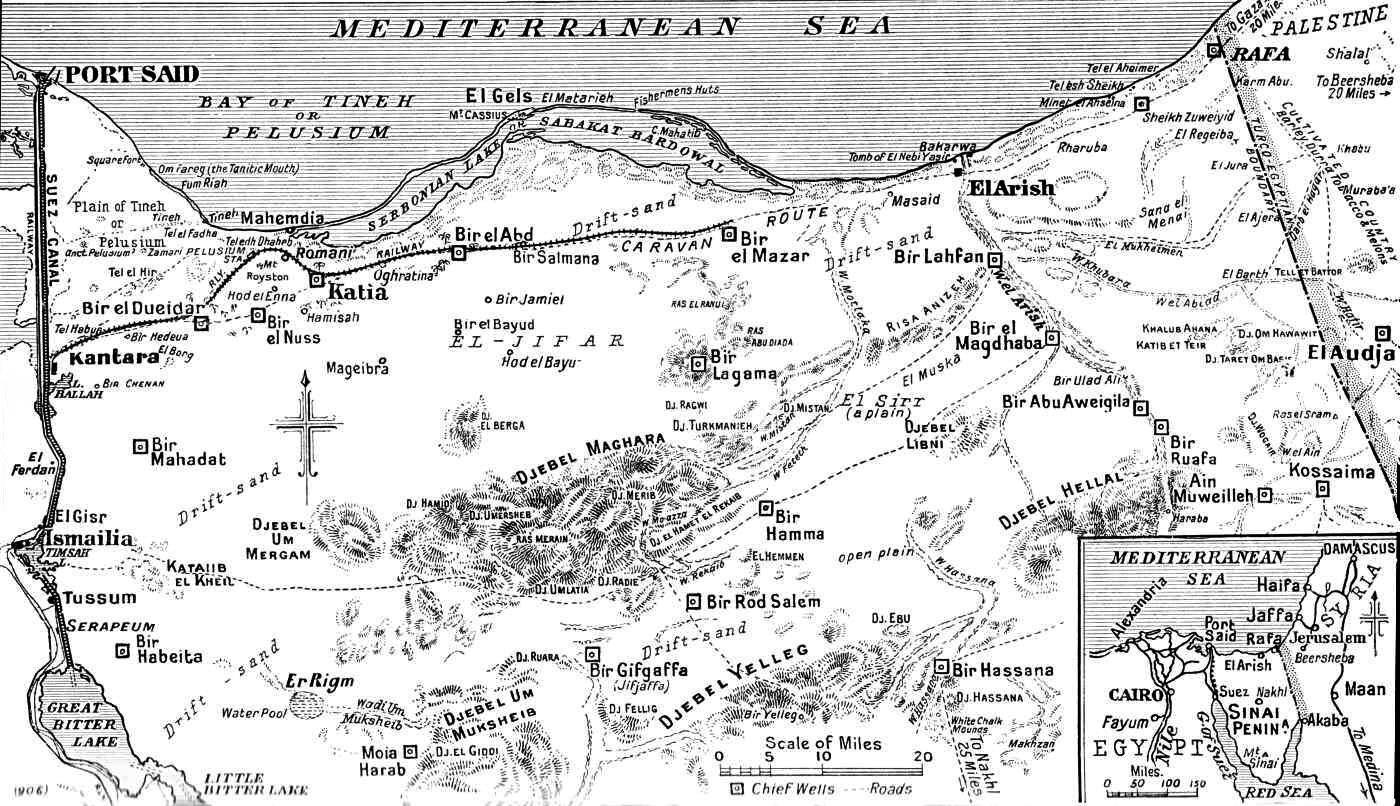
Map of north and central Sinai, 1917

One of many retaliatory air raids carried out by German/Ottoman airmen, occurred over El Arish on the same day, 19 January when the horse lines were targeted. Horse lines were easy and obvious targets from the air; they continued to suffer heavily from air raids throughout the war.

Also on 19 January, the first air reconnaissance of the Ottoman army rear over the towns of Beit Jibrin, Bethlehem, Jerusalem, and Jericho was carried out by Roberts and Ross Smith, escorted by Murray Jones and Ellis in Martinsydes. Junction Station was also reconnoitred on 27 January.

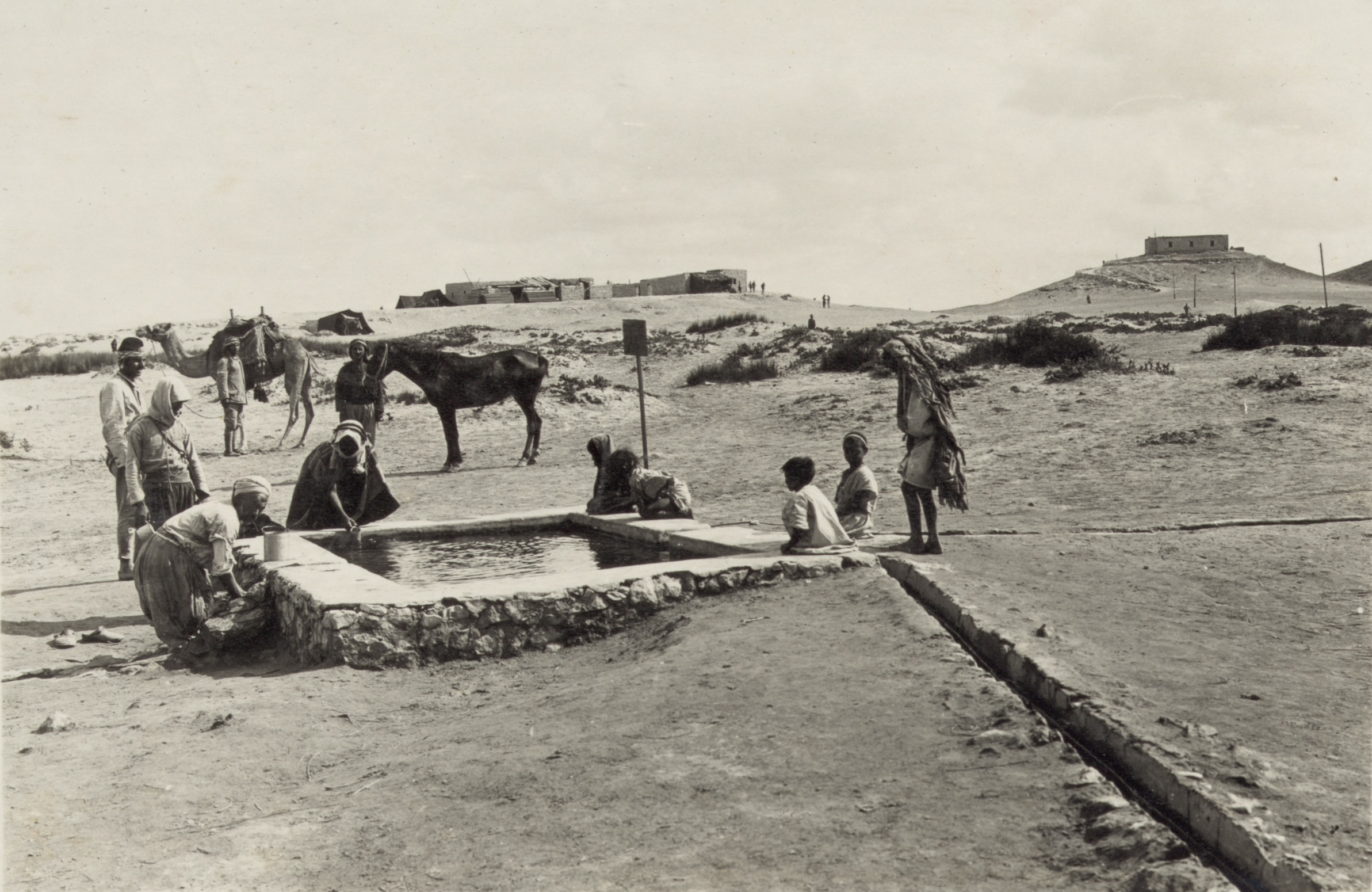
Kuseimeh

By the end of January both sides were carrying out heavy air attacks; the German and Ottoman pilots dropping bombs on the stores depot at the main base at El Arish, and Nos. 1 and 14 Squadrons regularly retaliating on Beersheba, Weli Sheikh Nuran, and Ramleh. The Germans were also bombing the Egyptian Labour Corps and delaying the building of the railway now near El Burj halfway between El Arish and Rafa with the wire road nearly at Sheikh Zowaiid. As a consequence on 3 February, Major General Chauvel was forced to order the cessation of Allied bombing in the hope that retaliations would also cease, so that the work on the rail line and pipeline could continue. The pipeline reached El Arish on 5 February.

In February 1917, the Ottoman Army was observed also building a light railway line from Tel el Sheria to Shellal, near Weli Sheikh Nuran, Sheria becoming the main Ottoman base midway along the Gaza–Beersheba defensive line.

The two final actions of the Sinai campaign took place in February 1917 when General Murray ordered attacks on the Ottoman garrisons at Nekhl and Bir el Hassana. The 11th Light Horse Regiment conducted the raid on Nekhl on 17 February. Meanwhile, the 2nd Battalion (British) of the Imperial Camel Corps, together with the Hong Kong and Singapore (Mountain) Battery, conducted the raid on Bir el Hassana, which surrendered with minimal resistance on 18 February.

== Palestine campaign begins ==
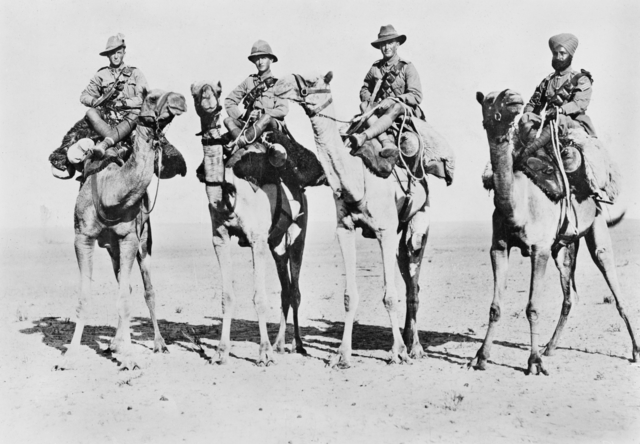
Australian, English, New Zealand and Indian cameliers in Palestine.

The Palestine campaign began early in 1917 with active operations resulting in the capture of Ottoman Empire territory stretching 370 miles (600 km) to the north, being fought continuously from the end of October to the end of December 1917. Operations in the Jordan Valley and into the Transjordan, fought between February and May 1918 were followed by the British occupation of the Jordan Valley while stalemated trench warfare continued across the Judean Hills to the Mediterranean Sea. The final Palestine offensive began in mid-September and the Armistice with the Ottoman Empire signed on 30 October 1918.

With the victory at Rafa, Murray had successfully accomplished all his and the War Office's objectives; he had secured the Suez Canal and Egypt from any possibility of a serious land attack and his forces controlled the Sinai Peninsula with a series of strongly fortified positions in depth, along a substantial line of communication based around the railway and pipeline, from Kantara on the Suez Canal to Rafa.

However, within two days of the victory at Rafa on 11 January 1917, General Murray was informed by the War Office that, rather than building on the momentum created over the last two and a half weeks by the victories at Magdhaba and Rafa by encouraging him to further advances with promises of more troops, he was required to send the 42nd (East Lancashire) Division on 17 January, to reinforce the Western Front, the decisive theatre where the strategic priority was focused on planning for a spring offensive.

But just a week after the 42nd Division departed, an Anglo-French conference at Calais on 26 February 1917, decided to encourage all fronts in a series of offensives to begin more or less simultaneously with the beginning of the spring offensive on the Western Front. And so the British War Cabinet and the War Office agreed to Murray's proposal to attack Gaza but without replacing the departed infantry division or offering any other reinforcements and the attack could not take place until 26 March.

While these political machinations were running their course, the Anzac Mounted Division returned to El Arish not far from the Mediterranean Sea, where there was easy access to plentiful fresh water and supplies. During this period of much needed rest and recuperation after the demanding desert campaign of the preceding ten months, sea bathing, football and boxing together with interest in the advance of the railway and pipeline were the main occupations of the troops from early January to the last weeks of February 1917.

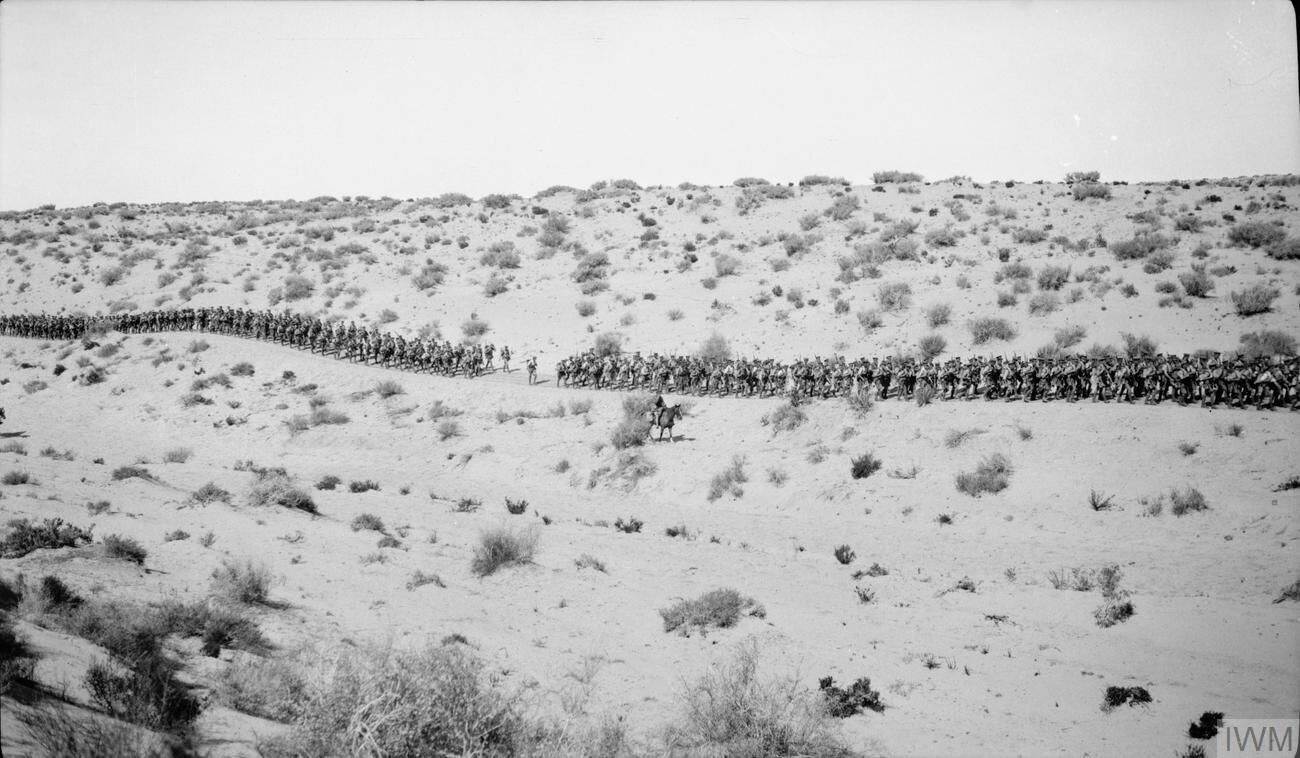
February 1917 Infantry marching on the wire road across the desert between Bir el Mazar and Bardawil

As the British war machine pushed on across the Sinai Peninsula the infrastructure and supporting British garrisons strongly held all the territory they occupied. By the end of February 1917, 388 miles of railway (at a rate of 1 kilometre a day), 203 miles of metalled road, 86 miles of wire and brushwood roads and 300 miles of water pipeline had been constructed. The pipeline required three huge pumping plants working 24 hours a day at Kantara, near a reservoir of 6,000,000 gallons. For local use, the pumps forced the water through 5 inch pipe to Dueidar, through a 6 inch pipe to Pelusium, Romani and Mahemdia and through a 12 inch pipe the main supply was pushed across the desert from pumping station to pumping station. At Romani a concrete reservoir contained a further 6,000,000 gallons, at Bir el Abd 5,000,000 and at Mazar 500,000 and another of 500,000 at El Arish. And with railhead at Rafa, Gaza was by then just twenty miles away, five to six hours for infantry and mounted units at a walk and 2 hours distant for horses at a trot.

=== Sykes–Picot and Saint-Jean-de-Maurienne ===
When the possibility of a British invasion of Palestine was first raised, it became necessary to reach an understanding with France, which also had an interest in Palestine and Syria. As early as 16 May 1916 Sir Mark Sykes, who had studied the political problems of Mesopotamia and Syria, had agreed with M. Picot, formerly a French consul at Beirut, that Britain would occupy Palestine and France would occupy Syria. They also agreed that an all-arms French contingent would be attached to the Egyptian Expeditionary Force.

Italy's initial efforts to participate on the ground in Palestine were rebuffed, but in a secret accord at Saint-Jean-de-Maurienne her allies promised to include her in negotiations concerning the government of Palestine after the war. On 9 April 1917 Italy's ambassador in London, Guglielmo Imperiali, finally received approval to send no more than "some three hundred men ... for representative purposes only" to Palestine. In the end, 500 infantry were sent. This included some Bersaglieri, whose famous capercaillie feathers are visible in photographs from the fall of Jerusalem. Their "mainly political" role was to assert "hereditary ecclesiastical prerogatives in connection with the Christian churches at Jerusalem and Bethlehem". In the fall of 1918, Allenby was willing to accept more Italian help, but although the Italian foreign minister, Sidney Sonnino, made promises, nothing came of them.

=== Eastern Force reorganisation ===
With the departure of the 42nd (East Lancashire) Division for the Western Front, its place at El Arish was taken by 53rd (Welsh) Division which transferred from garrison duties in Upper Egypt following the defeat of the Senussi. And the 54th (East Anglian) Division, which had been in the Southern Section of the Suez Canal Defences also moved eastwards to El Arish, while the new 74th (Yeomanry) Division was being formed from dismounted yeomanry brigades in Egypt.

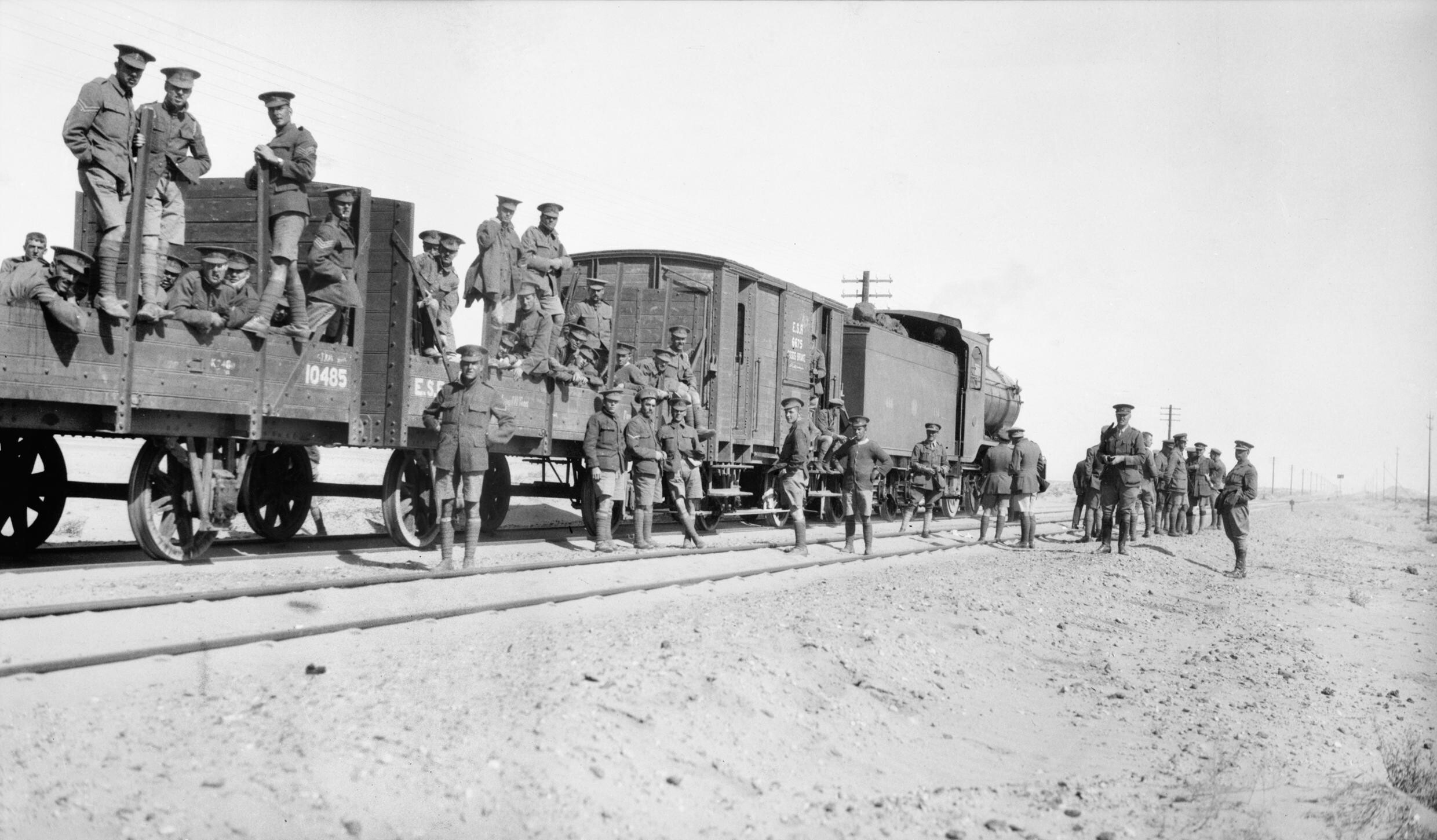
1/11th County of London Battalion London Regiment, 162nd Brigade, 54th (East Anglian) Division halted during the journey from Suez to Kantara

The arrival of 6th and 22nd Mounted Brigades from the Salonika front prompted a reorganisation of Desert Column. Instead of grouping the two new brigades with the 4th Light Horse Brigade (in the process of formation) and the 5th Mounted Brigade to form the new Imperial Mounted division, (established 12 February 1917 at Ferry Post on the Suez Canal under the command of British Army Major General H.W. Hodgson) the Anzac Mounted Division's 3rd Light Horse Brigade was transferred and the newly arrived 22nd Mounted Brigade was attached to the Anzac Mounted Division.

Thus by March 1917 General Charles Dobell commander of Eastern Force had 52nd (Lowland) and 54th (East Anglian) Divisions and the Imperial Camel Corps Brigade directly in his command and Desert Column commanded by Chetwode consisting of the 53rd (Welsh) Division commanded by Major General Dallas, Anzac Mounted Division commanded by Chauvel now made up of 1st and 2nd Light Horse, New Zealand Mounted Rifles and 22nd Mounted Yeomanry Brigades and the Imperial Mounted Division commanded by Hodgson now made up of the 3rd and 4th Light Horse with the 5th and 6th Mounted Brigades and two Light Car Patrols. The 3rd Light Horse Brigade rather resented the change, as they lost the connection with their service on Gallipoli via the old name of Anzac.

The Imperial Mounted Division moved up from Ferry Post to join Desert Column at el Burj just past El Arish on the road to Gaza between 28 February and 9 March; the 3rd Light Horse Brigade coming under their orders on 2 March and the Imperial Mounted Division coming under orders of Desert Column on 10 March 1917. The 4th Light Horse Brigade, in the process of formation at Ferry Post, planned to leave on 18 March.

Transport was also reorganised; the horse drawn supply columns were combined with the camel trains so that Eastern Force could operate for about twenty four hours beyond railhead. This was a vast undertaking; one brigade (and there were six) of Light Horse at war establishment consisted of approximately 2,000 soldiers as well as a division of infantry; all requiring sustenance.

=== Ottoman Army units ===
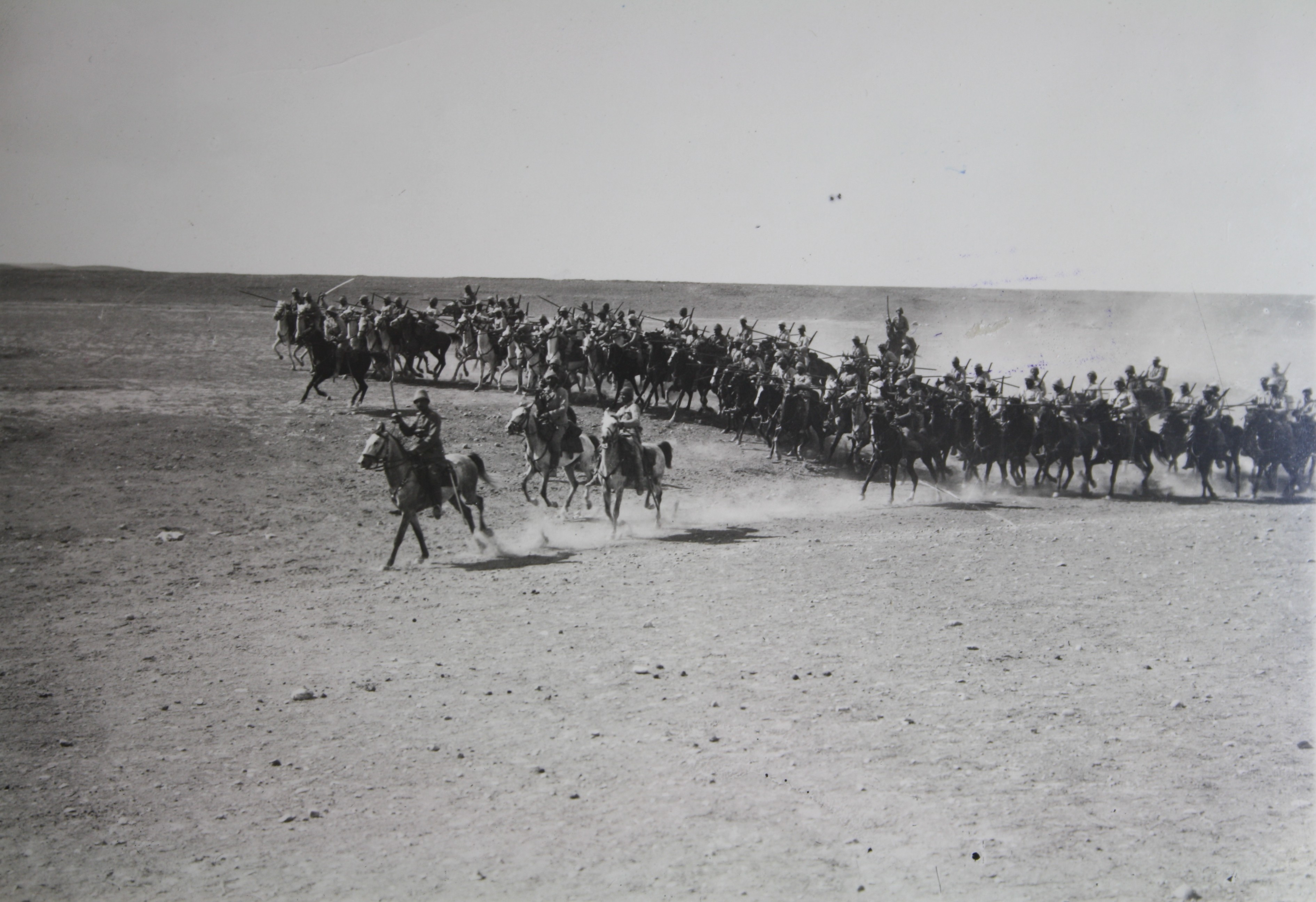
Ottoman cavalry unit during World War I frontal assault Palestine

That February, British intelligence reported the arrival in the region, of two divisions of the Ottoman Army; the 3rd Cavalry Division (from the Caucasus) and the 16th Infantry Division (from Thrace). They joined three infantry divisions in the area; along the 30 kilometres (19 mi) long Gaza–Beersheba line, the Fourth Army had about eighteen thousand soldiers. Kress von Kressenstein allocated some troops to both Gaza and Beersheba, but held the majority in reserve at Tell esh Sheria and Jemmameh and by mid March the Ottoman Army's 53rd Infantry Division was on its way south from Jaffa to augment these troops. The garrison at Gaza consisting of seven battalions could muster 3,500 rifles, machine gun companies and five batteries of 20 guns, supported by a squadron of newly arrived German Halberstadt fighter aircraft, which outclassed Allied aircraft and gave the Ottoman Army local air mastery.

It was believed the Ottoman Army had 7,000 rifles supported by heavy field and machine guns with reserves close by at Gaza and Tel el Sheria.

Between the victory at Rafa and the end of February 70 deserters entered the British lines and it was believed that this represented a small proportion as the majority of Arabs and Syrians disappeared into the towns and villages of Palestine and the Transjordan.

c.1917 Ottoman Turkish map of the Sinai and Palestine Campaign

== Gaza campaign ==
=== First Battle of Gaza, 26 March ===
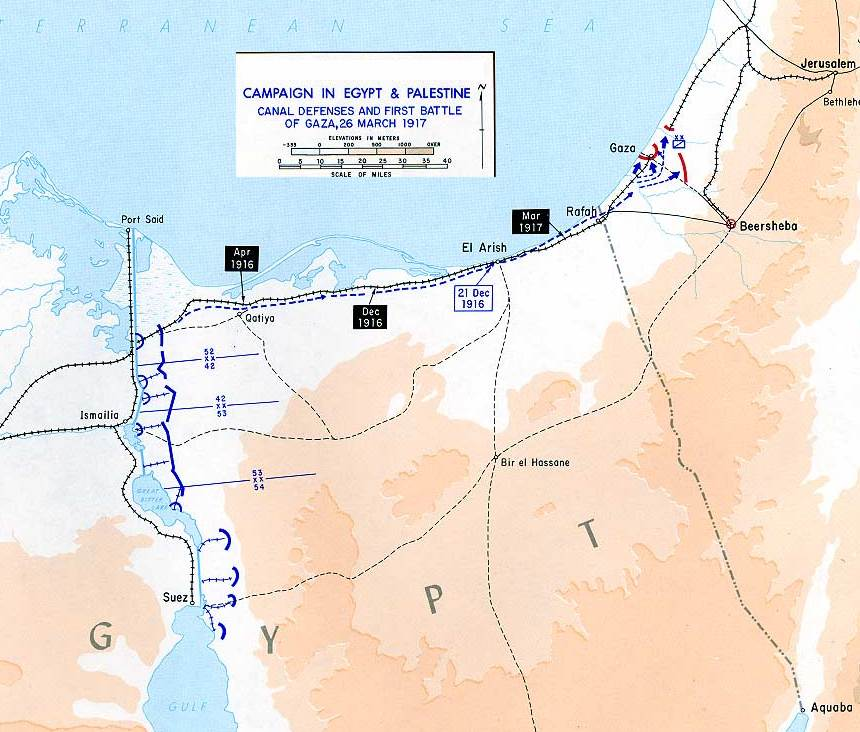
Assault on Gaza 1917 showing Suez Canal defences and lines of communication across the Sinai Peninsula

The Ottoman Army gave up a small area of the southern Ottoman Empire to retire to Gaza on the shore of the Mediterranean Sea, holding large garrisons spread across the area to Beersheba; to the north east, east, and south east at Hareira, Tel el Sheria, Jemmameh, Tel el Negile, Huj and Beersheba.

While Desert Column's Anzac and partly formed Imperial Mounted Divisions stopped Ottoman reinforcements from pushing through to join the Ottoman garrison at Gaza, on 26 March, the 53rd (Welsh) Division supported by a brigade from the 54th (East Anglian) Division attacked the strong entrenchments to the south of the town. In the afternoon, after being reinforced by the Anzac Mounted Division, the all arms' attack quickly began to succeed. With most objectives captured, night stopped the attack and the withdrawal was ordered before the commanders were fully aware of the gains captured.

The government in London believed reports by Dobell and Murray indicating a substantial victory had been won and ordered Murray to move on and capture Jerusalem. The British were in no position to attack Jerusalem as they had yet to break through the Ottoman defences at Gaza.

=== Hiatus ===
We have moved camp from a hill above the village of Deir Beulah to a lonely spot in the grove by the shores of a sweet water lake and close to the sea. The trees and tangles of most luxuriant creepers and bushes conceal also some field batteries and hundreds of tons of shells and high explosives. Behind us are our heavies and cavalry and very near in front our entrenched infantry with whom we are in touch. Absurdly near to these are the Turkish positions, trenches and redoubts. As we crossed the plain and a little ridge of hills to my new position on Palm Sunday, [1 April] Turkish HE [High Explosive] shells were falling pretty freely, but in a seemingly rather aimless way and the same desultory fire kept up all Monday. Aircraft and anti-aircraft guns were busy nearly all the time keeping up a constant hubbub. The next day, Tuesday 3 April, the Turks attacked and I was lucky enough to have a sort of front seat for the whole show, including the repulse of their infantry onslaught.

— Joseph W. McPherson, Egyptian Camel Transport Corps

Surrounded by palms and olive groves, Deir el Belah is 5 miles (8.0 km) north east of Khan Yunis and 8 miles (13 km) south west of Gaza. From Deir el Belah active patrolling towards Sharia and Beersheba continued. Here the 1st Light Horse Brigade rejoined the Anzac Mounted Division, three Hotchkiss light machine guns were issued to every squadron, substantially increasing the firepower of the mounted infantry and training in their use and gas helmets was carried out. Deir el Belah became the headquarters of Eastern Force after railhead reached there on 5 April and the arrival of the 74th (Yeomanry) Division increased the force to four infantry divisions.

General Murray had created the impression that the First Battle of Gaza had ended better than it had and the defenders had suffered more, with the chief of the Imperial General Staff William Robertson in London. Continuing inconclusive fighting in France resulted in Murray being encouraged on 2 April to begin a major offensive; to aim for Jerusalem, in the hope of raising morale. (Note: General Murray had been Robertson's immediate predecessor. Chief of the General Staff (United Kingdom)#Chiefs of the Imperial General Staff, 1909–1964) By 18 April it was clear Nivelle's offensive had not succeeded, the newly democratic Russia could no longer be relied on to attack the German or Ottoman empires freeing them to reinforce Palestine and Mesopotamia, and the resumption of unrestricted German U-boat warfare was sinking 13 British ships a day when the average during 1916 had been only three. This misunderstanding of the actual position in southern Palestine "rest squarely on General Murray for, whether he intended it or not, the wording of the reports fully justifies the interpretation placed upon them."

=== Second Battle of Gaza, 17–19 April ===
The First Battle of Gaza had been fought by the mounted divisions during an "encounter battle" when speed and surprise were emphasised. Then Gaza had been an outpost garrisoned by a strong detachment on the flank of a line stretching eastwards from the Mediterranean Sea. During the three weeks between the First and Second Battles of Gaza, the town was quickly developed into the strongest point in a series of strongly entrenched positions extending to Hareira 12 miles (19 km) east of Gaza and south east towards Beersheba. The Ottoman defenders not only increased the width and depth of their front lines, they developed mutually supporting strong redoubts on ideal defensive ground.

The construction of these defences changed the nature of the Second Battle of Gaza, fought from 17 to 19 April 1917, to an infantry frontal attack across open ground against well prepared entrenchments, with mounted troops in a supporting role. The infantry were strengthened by a detachment of eight Mark I tanks along with 4,000 rounds of 4.5-inch gas shells. The tanks were deployed along the front to give shelter to the infantry advancing behind them, but as the tanks became targets the infantry also suffered. Two tanks succeeded in reaching their objectives. Although the gas shells were fired during the first 40 minutes of the bombardment on a woodland area it appears they were ineffective.

The strength of the Ottoman fortifications and the determination of their soldiers defeated the EEF. The EEF's strength, which before the two battles for Gaza could have supported an advance into Palestine, was now decimated. Murray commanding the EEF and Dobell commanding Eastern Force were relieved of their commands and sent back to England.

=== Stalemate ===
From April to October 1917 the Ottoman and British Empire forces held their lines of defence from Gaza to Beersheba. Both sides constructed extensive entrenchments, which were particularly strong where the trenches almost converged, at Gaza and Beersheba. In the centre of the line, the defences at Atawineh, at Sausage Ridge, at Hareira, and at Teiaha supported each other. They overlooked an almost flat plain, devoid of cover, making a frontal attack virtually impossible. The trench lines resembled those on the Western Front, except they were not so extensive, and they had an open flank.

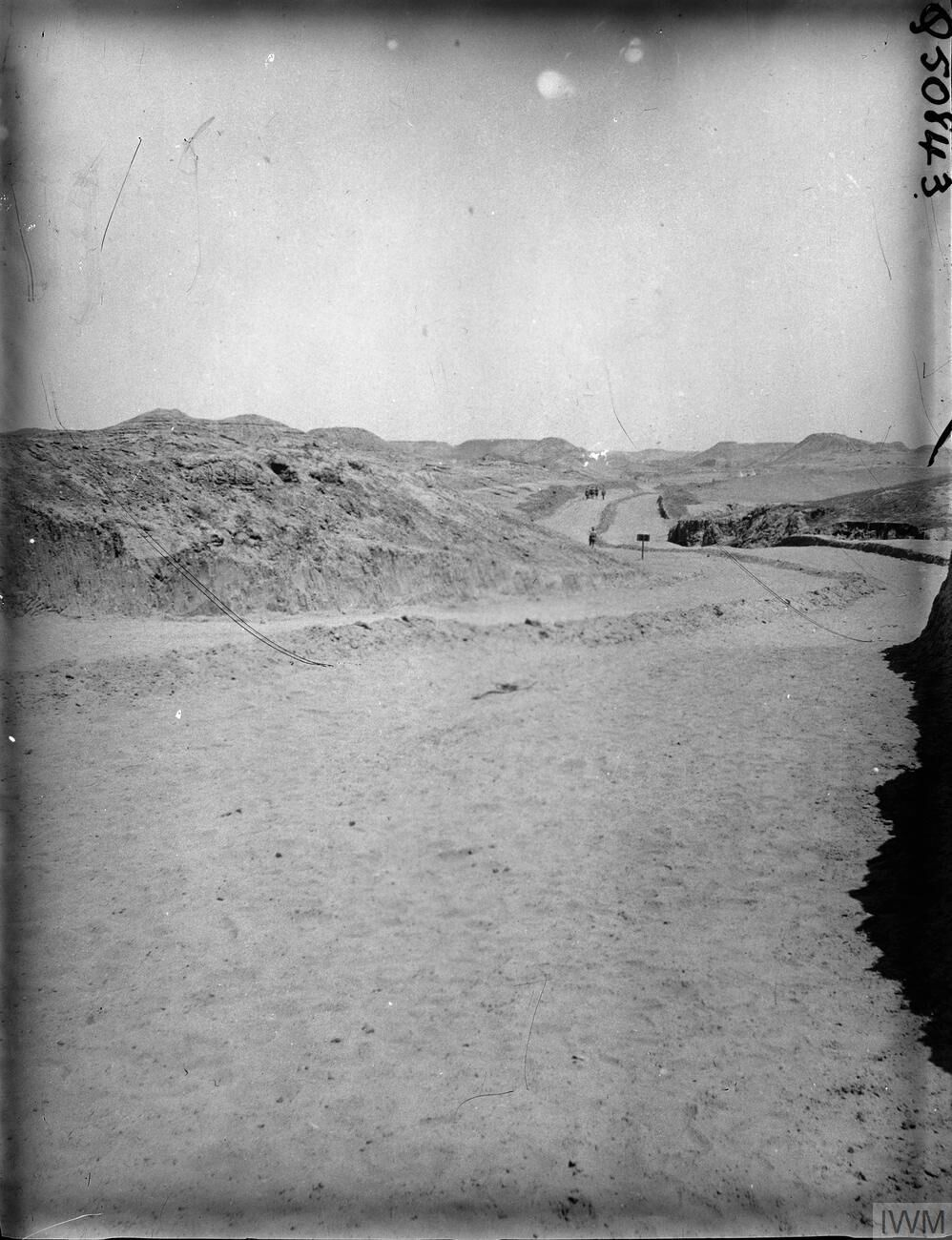
Shellal road

Both sides reorganised their armies in Palestine during the stalemate and appointed new commanders. The Yildirim Army Group (also known as Thunderbolt Army Group and Army Group F) was established in June, commanded by the German Empire General Erich von Falkenhayn. General Archibald Murray was sent back to England, replaced by Edmund Allenby in June to command the Egyptian Expeditionary Force. Allenby created two separate headquarters: one stayed in Cairo to administer Egypt, while his battle headquarters was established near Khan Yunis. He also reorganised the force into two infantry and one mounted corps. By 28 October 1917 the ration strength of the EEF fighting troops was 50,000. There were a further 70,000 unattested Egyptians.

==== Raid on Ottoman railway ====
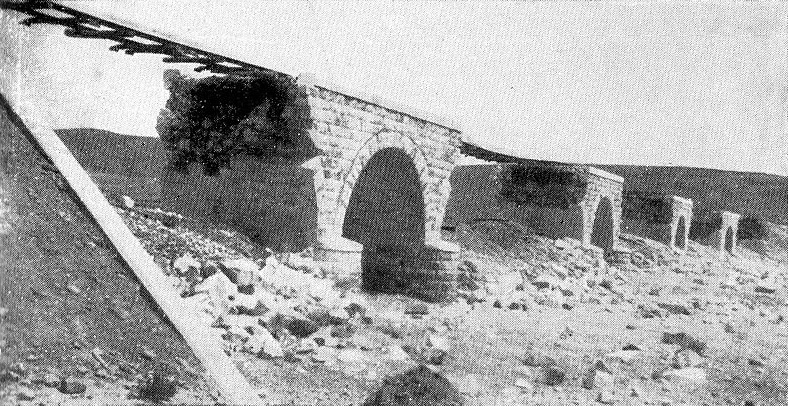
Part of 15 miles of railway line blown up in May 1917 by the Anzac and Imperial Mounted Divisions' and the Imperial Camel Corps Brigade' engineers assisted by troopers.

The main line of communication south from Beersheba to Hafir el Aujah and Kossaima was attacked on 23 May 1917 when substantial sections of the railway line were demolished by Royal Engineers of the Anzac and Imperial Mounted Divisions. This raid was covered by the two mounted divisions including a demonstration towards Beersheba.

==== Battle of Buqqar Ridge ====
The occupation of Karm by the Allies on 22 October 1917 created a major point for supply and water for the troops in the immediate area. For the Ottoman forces, the establishment of a railway station at Karm placed the defensive positions known as the Hareira Redoubt and Rushdie System which formed a powerful bulwark against any Allied action under threat.

To forestall this threat, General Erich von Falkenhayn, the Commander of the Yildirim Group, proposed a two phase attack. The plan called for a reconnaissance in force from Beersheba on 27 October, to be followed by an all out attack launched by the 8th Army from Hareira. This second phase was ironically scheduled to occur on the morning of 31 October 1917, the day when the Battle of Beersheba began.

== Southern Palestine offensive ==
=== Battle of Beersheba, 31 October ===
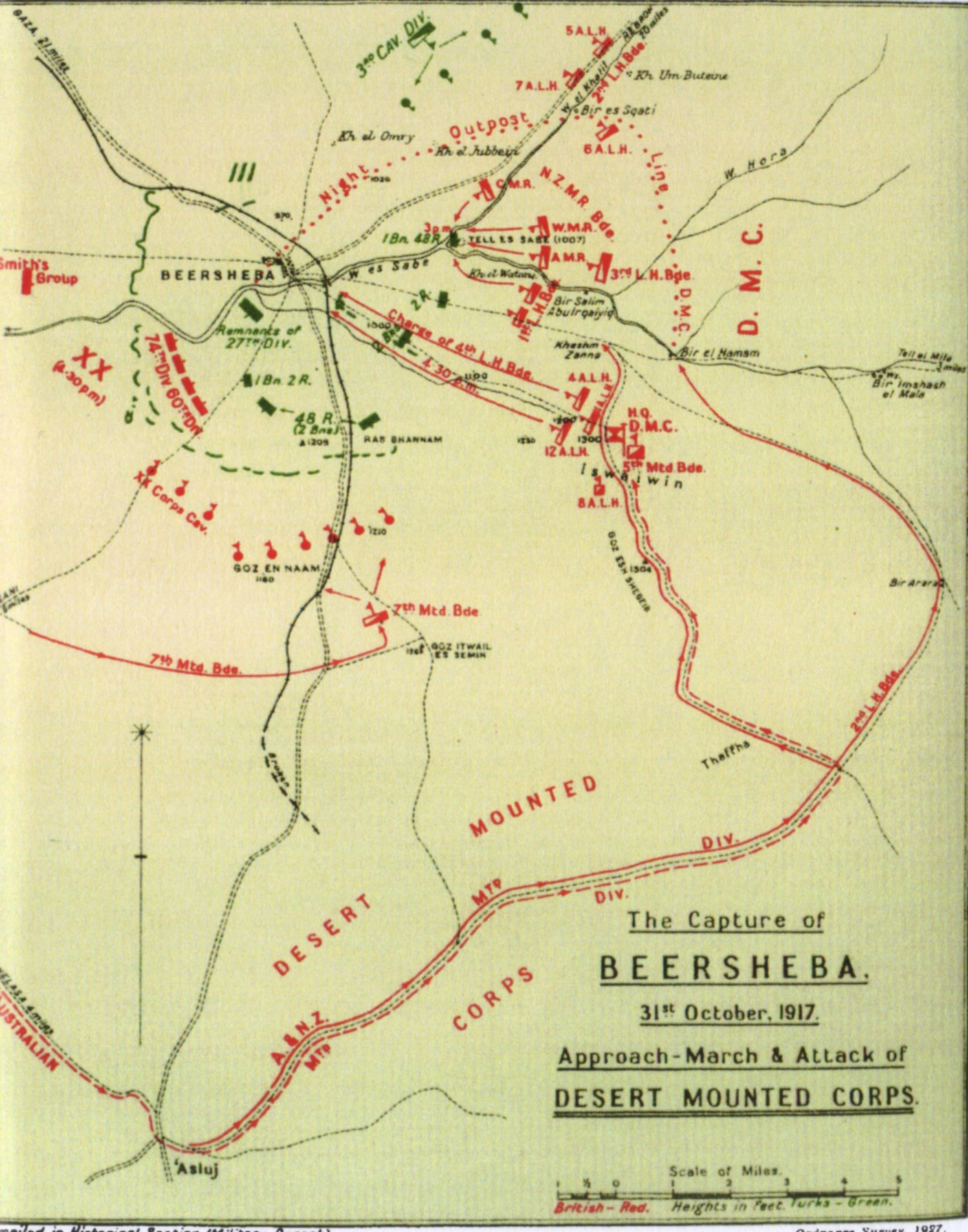
Approach marches and attacks

The Southern Palestine Offensive began with the attack on the headquarters of the Ottoman III Corps at Beersheba. The town was defended by 4,400 rifles, 60 machine guns, and 28 field guns including cavalry lancer and infantry regiments. They were deployed in well constructed trenches protected by some wire, strengthened by fortified defences to the north west, west, and south west of Beersheba. This semicircle of defences, included well-sited redoubts on a series of heights, up to 4 miles (6.4 km) from the town. These included Tel el Saba east of Beersheba defended by a battalion of the Ottoman 48th Regiment and a machine gun company. They were attacked by 47,500 rifles, in the XX Corps' 53rd (Welsh) Division, the 60th (2/2nd London) Division and the 74th (Yeomanry) Division, with the 10th (Irish) Division and the 1/2nd County of London Yeomanry attached, and about 15,000 troopers in the Anzac and Australian Mounted Divisions (Desert Mounted Corps).

After extensive and complex arrangements to support the infantry advance, the 60th (2/2nd London) and the 74th (Yeomanry) Divisions were to attack Beersheba from the west, while the Anzac Mounted Division with the Australian Mounted Division in reserve attacked the town from the east, after riding between 25 and 35 miles (40 to 56 km) to circle around Beersheba. The infantry attacks began with a bombardment and the capture of Hill 1070 which enabled the guns to move forward to target the trenches defending Beersheba. Intense hand to hand fighting continued until 13:30 when the Ottoman trench line on the western side of Beersheba, was captured. Meanwhile, Anzac Mounted Division advanced circling Beersheba, to cut the road north to Hebron and Jerusalem to prevent reinforcement and retreat from Beersheba, and launched their attack on Tel el Saba. The strongly entrenched defenders on Tel el Saba were initially attacked by the New Zealand Mounted Rifles Brigade, but by 10:00 they had been reinforced by the 1st Light Horse Brigade. The 3rd Light Horse Brigade (Australian Mounted Division) was later ordered to reinforce the Anzac Mounted Division's attack on this Ottoman position, but before they could get into position a general attack began at 14:05, resulting in the capture of Tel el Saba at 15:00.

Orders were issued for a general attack on Beersheba by the dismounted 1st and 3rd Light Horse Brigades and the mounted 4th Light Horse Brigade. As the leading squadrons of the 4th Light Horse Regiment of Victorians, and the New South Wales' 12th Light Horse Regiment, preceded by their scouts between 70 and 80 yards (64–73 m) in front, came within range of the Ottoman riflemen in defences "directly in their track," a number of horses were hit by sustained rapid fire. While the 4th Light Horse Regiment attacked these fortifications dismounted after jumping the trenches, most of the 12th Light Horse Regiment on the left rode through a gap in the defences to gallop into Beersheba to capture the garrison.

=== After the capture of Beersheba ===
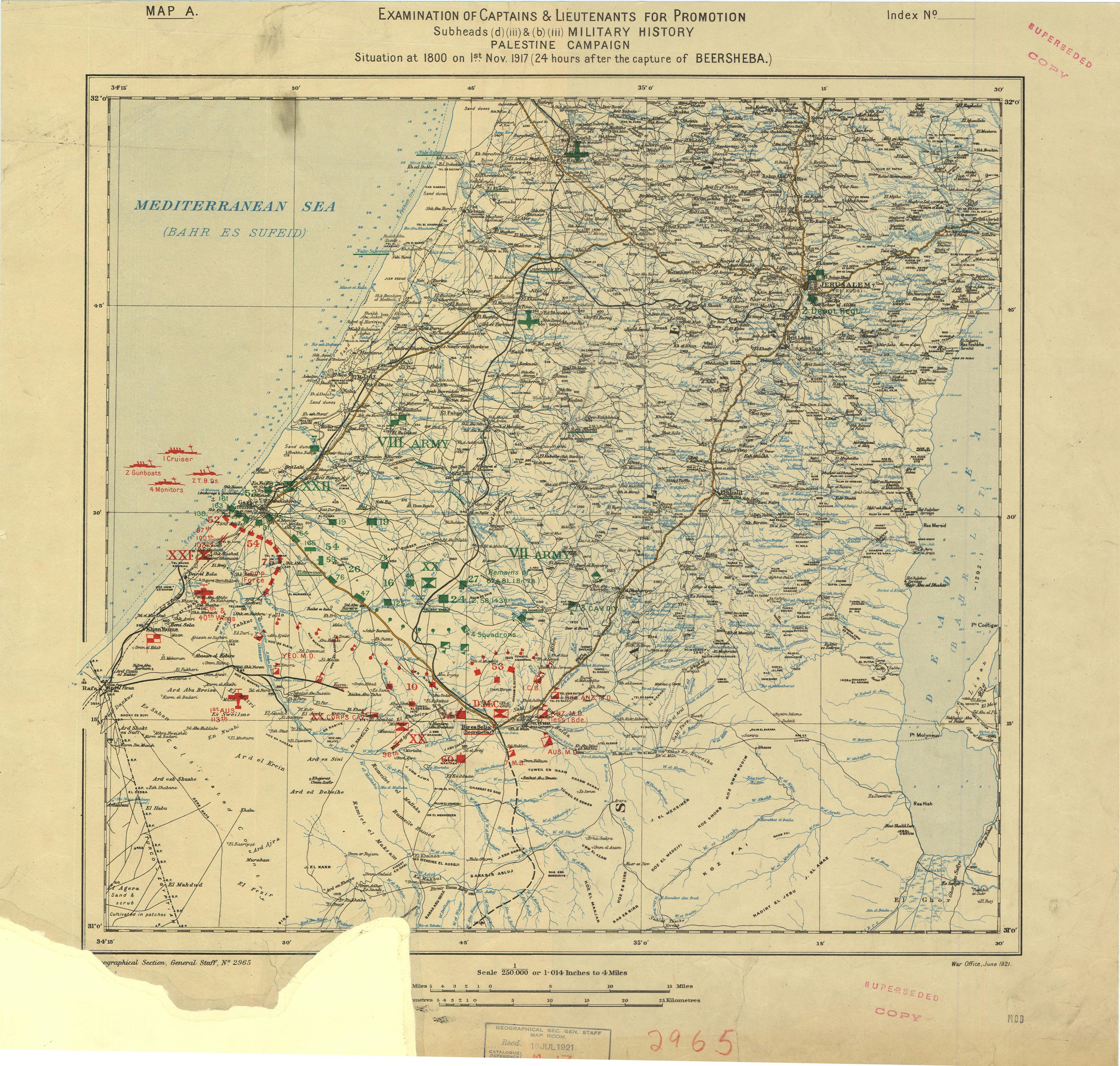
Military situation immediately prior to the release of the Balfour Declaration.

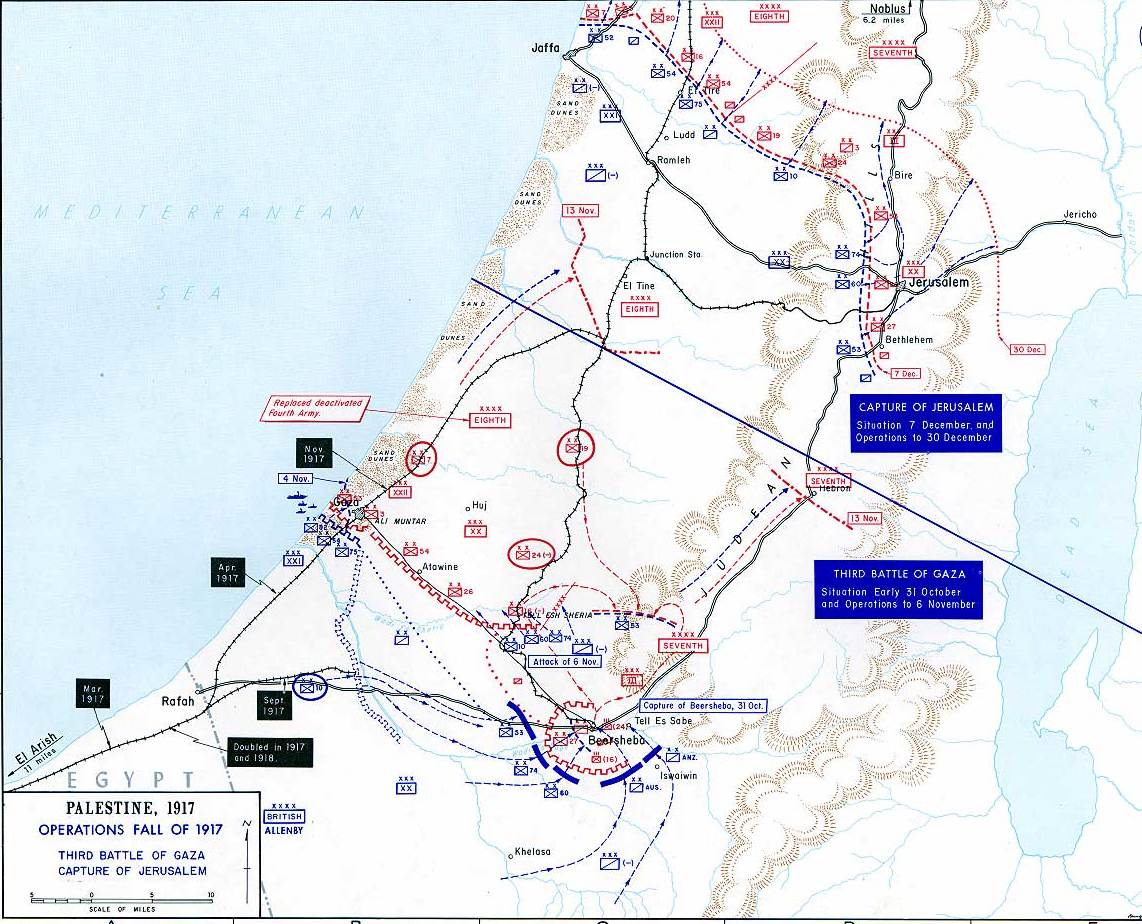
Allenby's Offensive, November–December 1917

[Allenby was] to press the Turks opposed to you to the fullest extent of your resources so as to force the enemy to divert troops to Palestine and thus relieve pressure upon Maude, and to take advantage of Arab situation. In deciding on the extent to which you will be able to carry out safely the policy, you will be guided by the fact that an increase in the forces now at your disposal is improbable.

— Robertson to Allenby, received 2 November 1917

From 1 to 6/7 November strong Ottoman rearguards at Tel el Khuweilfe in the Judean Hills, at Hareira and Sheria on the plain and at Sausage Ridge and Gaza on the Mediterranean coast held the Egyptian Expeditionary Force in heavy fighting. During this time the Ottoman Armies were able to withdraw in good order covered by strong rearguard garrisons, which themselves were able to retire under cover of darkness on the night of 6/7 November. The British Yeomanry cavalry Charge at Huj was launched against an Ottoman rearguard on 8 November. Allenby ordered the Egyptian Expeditionary Force to advance and capture the retreating Ottoman Seventh and Eighth Armies, but they were prevented from doing so by the strong rearguards.

The Tel el Khuweilfe battle was an "important sideshow to the collapse of the entire Turkish front from Gaza to Beersheba," as it diverted Ottoman reserves to the Khuweilfe area, preventing them being used to strengthen the centre of the Ottoman line at Hareira and Sheria. It also threatened an attack on Jerusalem, and placed pressure on the Ottoman command, who moved considerable forces eastwards from Sheria, to reinforce the defence of the road to Jerusalem and Tel el Khuweilfe, too far away to come to the aid of Gaza. By weakening the force defending Sheria it became possible for two infantry divisions and Desert Mounted Corps, all that could be deployed so far from base, to attack the remaining Ottoman forces, "to defeat and pursue it, and hustle it northward to Jaffa."

=== Advance to Jaffa and Judean Hills ===
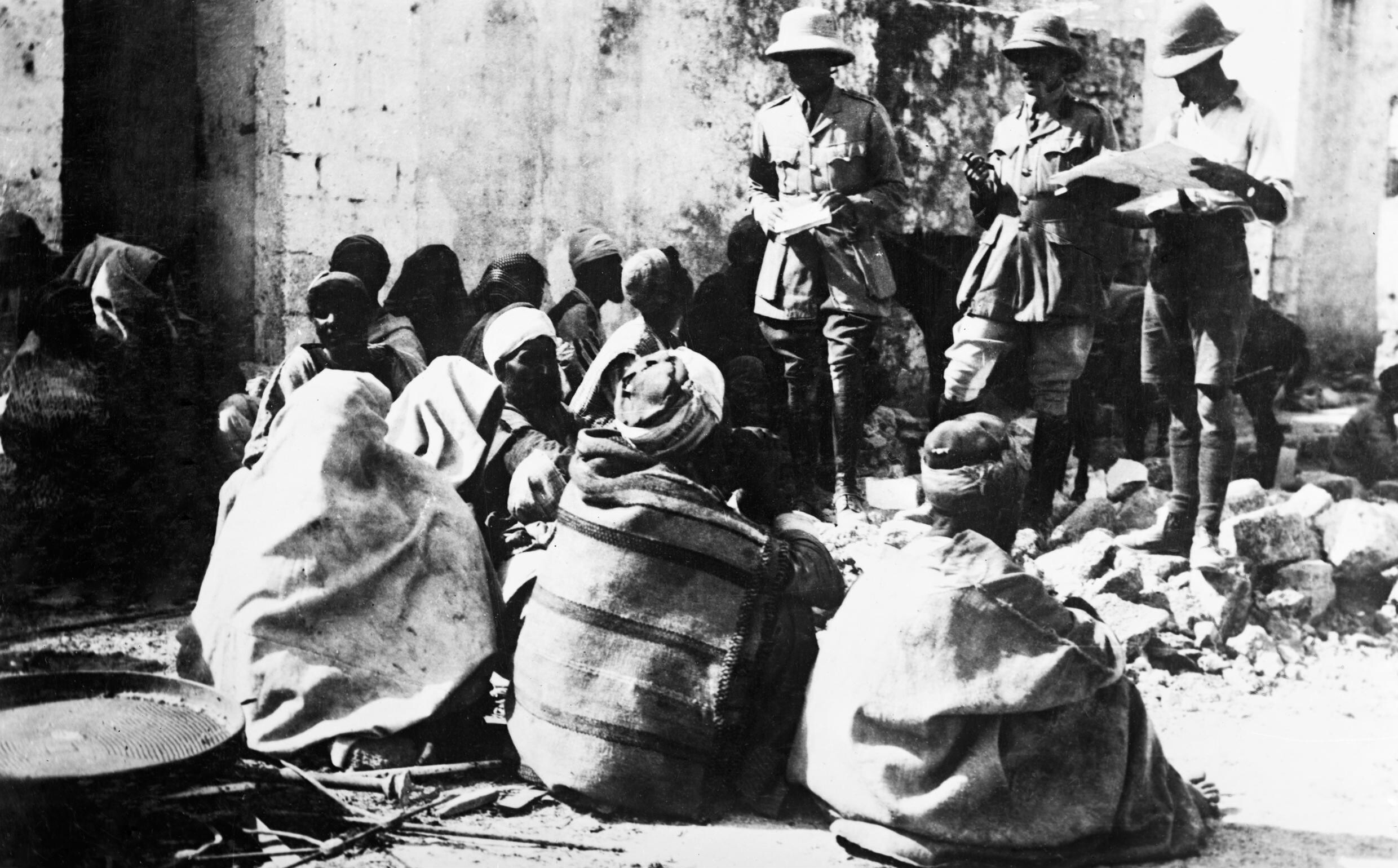
November 1918 British officer questioning the inhabitants of a captured village during the advance

An attempt on 12 November by four divisions of the Ottoman 8th Army to counterattack and stop the British advance in front of the vital Junction Station (Wadi Sara) on the Jaffa–Jerusalem railway, was held by the Australian Mounted Division reinforced with two additional brigades.

On 13 November the Egyptian Expeditionary Force attacked a 20,000-strong Ottoman force deployed on a hastily constructed but naturally strong defensive line. The main attack was carried out by the XXIst Corps's 52nd (Lowland) and 75th Divisions in the centre with the Australian Mounted Division on the right flank and the Anzac and Yeomanry Mounted Divisions on the left. The infantry in the centre prevailed supported by a cavalry charge by 6th Mounted Brigade (Yeomanry Mounted Division). And on 14 November the New Zealand Mounted Rifles Brigade defeated a substantial rearguard; the 3rd Ottoman Infantry Division at Ayun Kara. The combined effects of this series of devastating failures by the Ottoman Army was to see their 8th Army give up Jaffa and retire across the Nahr el Auja while their 7th Army withdrew into the Judean Hills to defend Jerusalem. They had withdrawn approximately 50 miles (80 km), losing 10,000 prisoners and 100 guns and suffering heavy casualties.

During the first EEF offensive from October to November 1917, Australian wounded were mainly treated in the 1,040 beds of No. 14 Australian General Hospital at the Abbassia Barracks, Cairo. Although No. 2 Australian Stationary Hospital at Moascar, was organised, equipped, and staffed for any type of medical or surgical work, it was retained as a Camp Clearing Hospital by the D.M.S., EEF. In November, 1917, the venereal section of No. 14 General Hospital was transferred to it.

=== Capture of Jerusalem ===
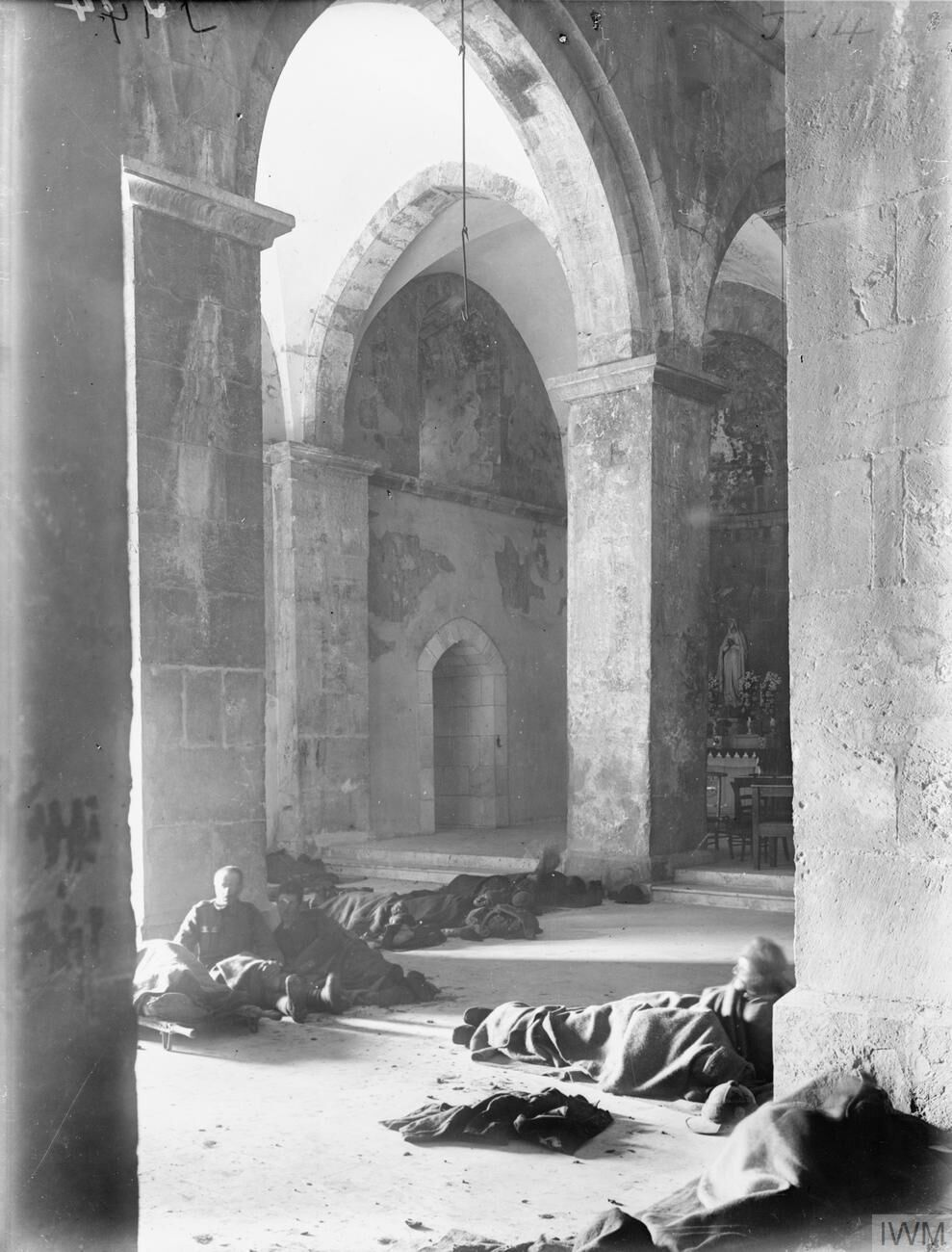
Wounded of the 5th Battalion Somerset Light Infantry and 4th Battalion Wiltshire Regiment in a Dressing Station located in the monastery at Kuryet el Enab which the 75th Division captured on 20 November 1917

Jerusalem operations began with the Battle of Nebi Samwill fought between 17 and 24 November, were continued by the subsidiary Battle of Jaffa between 21 and 22 December and ended with the defence of Jerusalem from 26 to 30 December 1917. These battles were ultimately successfully fought by the XX, XXI and the Desert Mounted Corps against the Ottoman 7th Army in the Judean Hills and their 8th Army. Battle lines extended from north of Jaffa on the Mediterranean Sea across the Judean Hills to Bireh and east of the Mount of Olives.

The battlefield over which the Battle of Nebi Samwil was fought continued to be subject to attacks and counterattacks until early December when Jerusalem was occupied by the British. Fighting also continued in the vicinity Bireh and the main Ottoman supply line running along the Jerusalem to Nablus road north of the city.

After the Ottoman Army had evacuated Jerusalem, the city was occupied on 9 December 1917. This was a major political event for the British government of David Lloyd George, one of the few real successes the British could point to after a year of bitter disappointments on the Western Front.

On the Ottoman side, this defeat marked the exit of Djemal Pasha, who returned to Istanbul. Djemal had delegated the actual command of his army to German officers such as von Kressenstein and von Falkenhayn more than a year earlier, but now, defeated as Enver Pasha had been at the Battle of Sarikamish, he gave up even nominal command and returned to the capital. Less than a year remained before he was forced out of the government. Falkenhayn was also replaced, in March 1918.

== Winter 1917–18 ==
=== Administration of captured territory ===
When Allenby first assumed command of the Egyptian Expeditionary Force he quickly joined the army in the field leaving the political and administrative problems related to the Egyptian Mandate to a government appointee with a suitable staff. The area of formerly Ottoman territory now under occupation also required management, and with the approval of the government, Allenby appointed a chief administrator for Palestine. He divided the country into four districts: Jerusalem, Jaffa, Majdal and Beersheba, each under a military governor. Under this administration the immediate needs of the people were provided for, seed grain and live–stock were imported and distributed, finance on easy terms was made available through the Army bankers, a stable currency was set up and postal services restored.

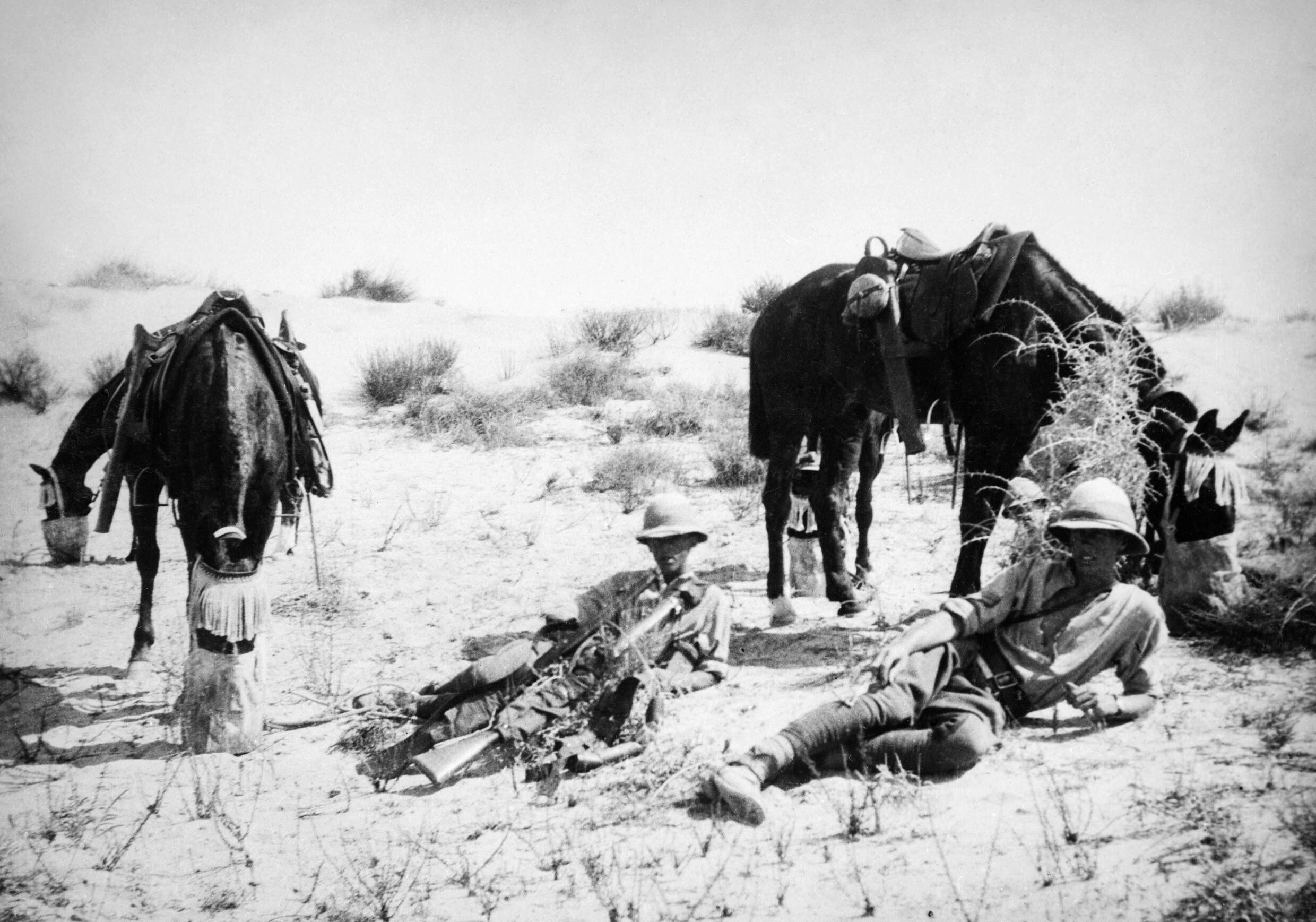
Yeomanry patrol in 1918 during a pause in the desert

On 15 January 1918 Allenby reported to DMI regarding attitudes to the occupation of Jerusalem. The report recounted that the Moslems were for the most part non-committal, while the partisans of Sherif were genuinely pleased but worried by Jewish influence. The attitude of Bedouin from East of Jerusalem to Bir El Saba (Beersheba) varied; some were unsatisfactory but the protection of the sacred Moslem places was generally accepted as satisfactory. The Jews were overjoyed by the support contained in the Balfour Declaration for Zionism and Christians were happy with the occupation.

Allenby was under pressure to set up foreign administrations in Palestine. Already the French representative in Palestine, Picot, was pressuring for a share in the administration of a French Protectorate in the Holy Land by pushing to assume the rights and dignities in church which the French representative enjoyed before the war. His presence and behaviour was resented by the Italians and the church representatives became angry. Allenby was aware that in Jerusalem angry priests came to blows in the Holy Places from time to time. He insisted that while military administration was required it must be under the British Commander in Chief alone.

=== Consolidation of EEF territorial gains ===
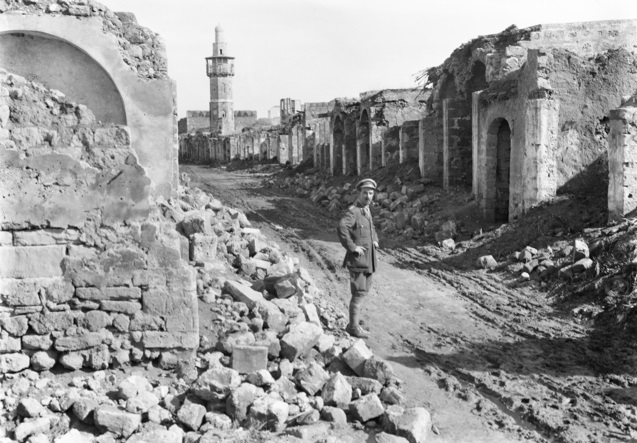
Gaza in ruins, February 1918

The weather was beginning to improve and railways and roads were being repaired and developed. A lateral line of communication north of the Jaffa to Jerusalem road required the complete reconstruction of the track from Amwas through Beit Sira by the Egyptian Labour Corps. The standard gauge line reached Ludd and was within .25 miles (400 m) of Allenby's headquarters 2 miles (3.2 km) west of Ramleh. He wrote on 25 January: "I want to extend my right, to include Jericho and the N. of the Dead Sea." On 3 January two Australian aircraft discovered boats carrying corn and hay produced on the plains to the east and south-east of the Dead Sea for the forces at Amman. The boats moving from Ghor el Hadit (behind Point Costigan) and Rujm el Bahr at the northern end of the Sea were bombed and sprayed with bullets by the Australian aircraft which returned again and again until the boat service stopped.

Allenby's next strategic moves were to extend his right to include Jericho, then to cross the Jordan River and advance to Amman and destroy 10–15 miles (16–24 km) of the Hedjaz railway to isolate Ottoman forces near Medina and encourage further Arab uprisings. (Note: Allenby wrote to Robertson on 25 January 1918: "If I could destroy 10 or 15 miles of rail and some bridges and get touch with the Arabs under Feisal – even temporarily – the effect would be great." [Allenby letter to Robertson 25 January 1918 in Hughes 2004, p. 127] Fifteen miles of railway including all bridges were destroyed on 23 May 1917 on the railway from Beersheba to Auja. [Wavell 1968, p. 90; Powles 1922, pp. 110, 113] For a description of the procedure used to destroy the rails see Powles 1922, p. 112.)

The whole British advanced base of operations had moved north from Deir el Belah to the new railhead and at Ramleh the Director of Medical Services' headquarters were also the headquarters of the Motor Ambulance Convoy. Thirteen casualty clearing stations and stationary hospitals had been established along the lines of communication from Jaffa and Jerusalem to Kantara and by March 1918 ambulance trains ran to Kantara from Ludd.

=== Westerners versus Easterners ===
By the end of 1917 all the objectives of the campaign to capture Jerusalem had been achieved; Ottoman-German operations against Baghdad had been frustrated, the last reserves of Ottoman soldiers were engaged and the British nation's morale had been boosted.

The prime minister of the United Kingdom, David Lloyd George, wished to knock the Ottoman Empire out of the war in 1918. Already the 7th (Meerut) Division from Mesopotamia was ordered to Palestine and there were many who were worried that if significant forces were diverted from the Western Front to Palestine, England might protect her colonies but lose the war.

The Westerners argued that the real heart of the Ottoman Empire, Istanbul, still lay hundreds of miles from an advance to Damascus or even Aleppo and if the Ottoman Empire saw at the same time Germany overrunning France, it would not be enough to force the Ottoman Empire from the war. With Russia out of the war the Dardanelles were no longer an objective for the British Empire as access to the Russian fleet was no longer of any importance.

The Easterners accepted that it was essential to maintain the forces in France and Belgium on the Western Front, but that they were already sufficient to keep the front intact. They argued that 'to surrender the initiative everywhere and to concentrate on a policy of purely passive defence along the whole battle line was a counsel of despair.' Germany would have a brief window of opportunity thanks to the armistice between Russia and Germany, to attack the Allied forces on the Western Front before the United States, which had already entered the war could bring sufficient numbers to end Germany's war. But the Easterners asserted that during two years of war the Allies had superiority in numbers and material greater than the numbers the Germans could bring from the Russian front and they had failed to break the German lines. They argued that the Palestine theatre might be wasteful of shipping but the Western Front was wasteful of lives; that it would be folly to take seasoned troops from Palestine where a decisive victory could be won to die in the stalemate.

On 13 December 1917 the War Cabinet instructed the General Staff to consider two policies; the conquest of Palestine involving an advance of about 100 miles (160 km) or an advance to Aleppo to cut the Ottoman communications with Mesopotamia. On 14 December Allenby reported that the rainy season would prevent any further attacks for at least two months.

Qualified approval from the Supreme War Council for a decisive offensive to annihilate Ottoman armies and crush resistance was contained in Joint Note No. 12. It was claimed that the destruction of the Ottoman Empire 'would have far-reaching results upon the general military situation.' Early in February 1918 General Jan Christiaan Smuts (a member of the Imperial War Cabinet) was sent to confer with Allenby regarding the implementation of the Joint Note. The French imposed an important qualification on the Joint Note; that no British troops in France could be deployed to the Egyptian Expeditionary Force. Smuts informed Allenby the intention was to reinforce the Egyptian Expeditionary Force with one and possibly a second Indian cavalry division from France, three divisions from Mesopotamia and more artillery and aeroplanes. Smuts also suggested crossing the Jordan, capturing the Hejaz Railway and using it to outflank Damascus. (Note: The Hedjaz railway stretched 800 miles (1,300 km) from Medina to Damascus with connections to Istanbul and Baghdad. [Woodward 2006, p. 162])

== Judean Hills operations ==
=== Action of Tell 'Asur, 8–12 March ===
Also known as the Battle of Turmus 'Aya, this action fought between 8 and 12 March pushed the Egyptian Expeditionary Force' front line all the way from the Mediterranean Sea to Abu Tellul and Mussallabeh on the edge of the Jordan Valley northwards. Allenby's right flank was secure but was not sufficiently broad to support the planned operations across the Jordan to the Hedjaz railway; further territory was required to give more depth. During this operation a general advance on a front of 14–26 miles (23–42 km) and up to a maximum of 5–7 miles (8.0–11.3 km) in depth by both the XX and XXI Corps pushed the 7th and 8th Ottoman Armies north from the River Auja on the Mediterranean coast, from Abu Tellul and Mussallabeh on the edge of the Jordan Valley and up the Jerusalem to Nablus road capturing Ras el Ain.

=== Action of Berukin, 9–11 April ===
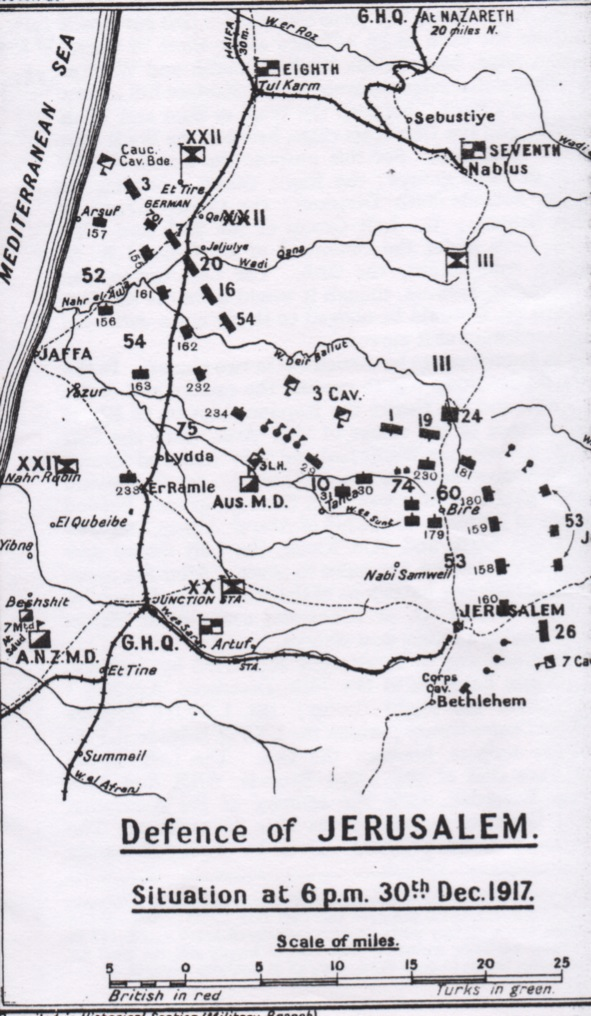
Falls Sketch Map 21 shows position of front line before the capture of Jericho

General Allenby intended to follow the cutting of the Hedjaz Railway at Amman with an advance to Tulkarm and Nablus and despite the failure of the Amman attack proceeded with plans to capture Tulkarm.

Known by the Ottoman Army as the action of Berukin, the attack between 9 and 11 April, was planned to begin with the 75th Division capturing the villages of Berukin, Sheikh Subi and Ra-fat together with the high ground at Arara. The 7th (Meerut) Division would then advance 2,000 yards (1,800 m) on a 5 miles (8.0 km) front and prepare gun positions from which to shell Jaljulia and Tabsor. The 54th and 75th Divisions would then advance to the Wadi Qarna with their left flank towards Qalqilye and Jaljulye with the 54th (East Anglian) Division sweeping westward along the Ottoman defences as far as Tabsor. As soon as Jaljulye and Qalqilye were cleared the Australian Mounted Division would ride hard for Et Tire and vigorously pursue the withdrawing Ottoman units as far as Tulkarm.

The 75th Division's preliminary attack, launched at 05:10 on 9 April ran into fierce Ottoman resistance supported by three German field batteries and German battalions were active in counterattacks using mortars and machine guns.

All three infantry brigades carried out the initial assault in line against Berukin, El Kufr, Ra-fat and Three Bushes Hill which were successfully captured, while Berukin was finally captured at 16:00. The delay in capturing Berukin slowed the attack of the other infantry brigades and gave the German and Ottoman defenders time to strengthen their defences, and as a result the attacks on Mogg Ridge, Sheikh Subi and Arara were postponed till the next day. During the night there were almost constant counterattacks, but the attack was continued at 06:00 on 10 April when the 2/3rd Gurkhas (232nd Brigade) reached the western edge of Mogg Ridge. Fighting here continued all day and at Sheikh Subi the attack broke down, while further west the attack on Arara had by 09:30 been partly successful. Almost the whole of Mogg Ridge was eventually captured but was successfully counterattacked, the German and Ottoman infantry being caught by determined British defence and a heavy British artillery barrage which prevented them following up their success. Again during the night determined Ottoman and German counterattacks continued and were partly successful. On 11 April it was clear determined defence would strenuously contest all attacks and it decided that the cost of continuing would be too high, but for the next seven days a long-range artillery duel between British and Ottoman/German guns continued. Finally on 21 April Three Bushes Hill was evacuated while Berukin, El Kufr and Ra-fat were retained and consolidated, including the Ra-fat salient.

At the end of two days' bitter hand-to-hand fighting the 75th Division was still to gain its objectives and was having difficulty holding on to the little it had gained because of fatigue and depleted numbers. Three days' fighting from 9 to 11 April proved once again that in the Judean Hills German and Ottoman machine guns could make any advance slow and expensive. (Note: Wavell claims the whole plan of attack was captured from the body of an officer on the first day. [Wavell 1968, pp. 183–4])

This action of Berukin occurred in a section of the line which would become part of the final offensive five months later, when the infantry attack would pivot on Ra-fat salient which would at that time be held by the Détachment Français de Palestine et de Syrie. In this case, the losses were heavy: 1,500 British casualties with about 200 Ottoman dead on the battlefield and 27 Ottoman and German prisoners.

=== Summer in the Judean hills ===
During the summer of 1918 the main focus of the war was naturally on the Western Front; the chief of the General Staff (CIGS) at the War Office in London could only offer Allenby railway construction men, and a possible increase in shipping to increase Allenby's supplies. Sir Henry Wilson had a plan for extend the railways after the collapse of the Ottoman Empire. "I want to see Aleppo joined to Mosul joined to Baku joined to the Urals joined to the Japanese army; and from that base an advance against the Boches."

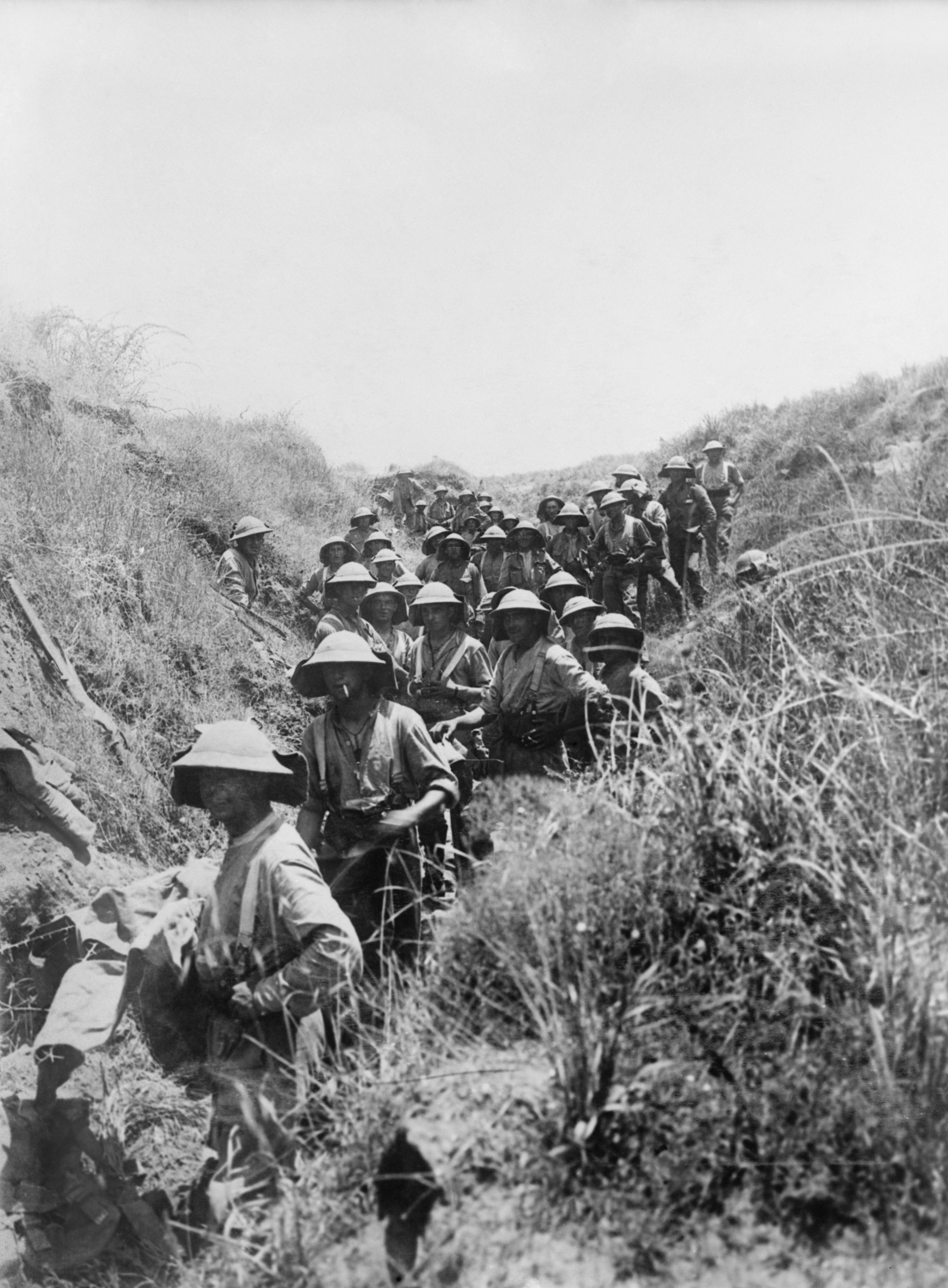
2nd Battalion Black Watch in trenches on Brown Ridge after the action at Arsuf on 8 June 1918

At this time the front line stretched from the Mediterranean Sea to the Dead Sea. From the middle of May to about the middle of October, the country through which the line passed was virtually dry, but temperatures could vary greatly. On the maritime plain the climate is almost sub-tropical, with sea breezes and an average temperature of 80 °F (27 °C). In the Judean Hills temperatures can vary by as much as 20 °F (11 °C) during a single day, and in the Jordan Valley shade temperatures of between 100–120 °F (38–49 °C) are common, with high humidity. This heat is accompanied in all sections of the line, by dust and insect pests including sand-flies and malarial mosquitoes, which are common along the whole of the front line.

The Palestine front was relatively quiet during the late spring and summer of 1918 with the exception of some brief fighting in midsummer. During the hot summer months of 1918 several British mainly small scale raids were made to improve Allied positions on the coastal plain and in the Judean Hills. These was one small British attack designed to improve the front on the coast, several British raids including one very large scale raid and one minor Ottoman attack. (Note: A comparison of Falls' Sketch Maps 18 and 30 shows that the front line was pushed north into the Judean Hills by about 5 miles (8.0 km) between the end of December 1917 and September 1918, to eventually follow the Nahr el Auja east from the Mediterranean coast, along the Wadi Deir Ballut and as a result of the capture of Jericho and occupation of the Jordan Valley, along the Wadi el Auja to the Jordan River.)

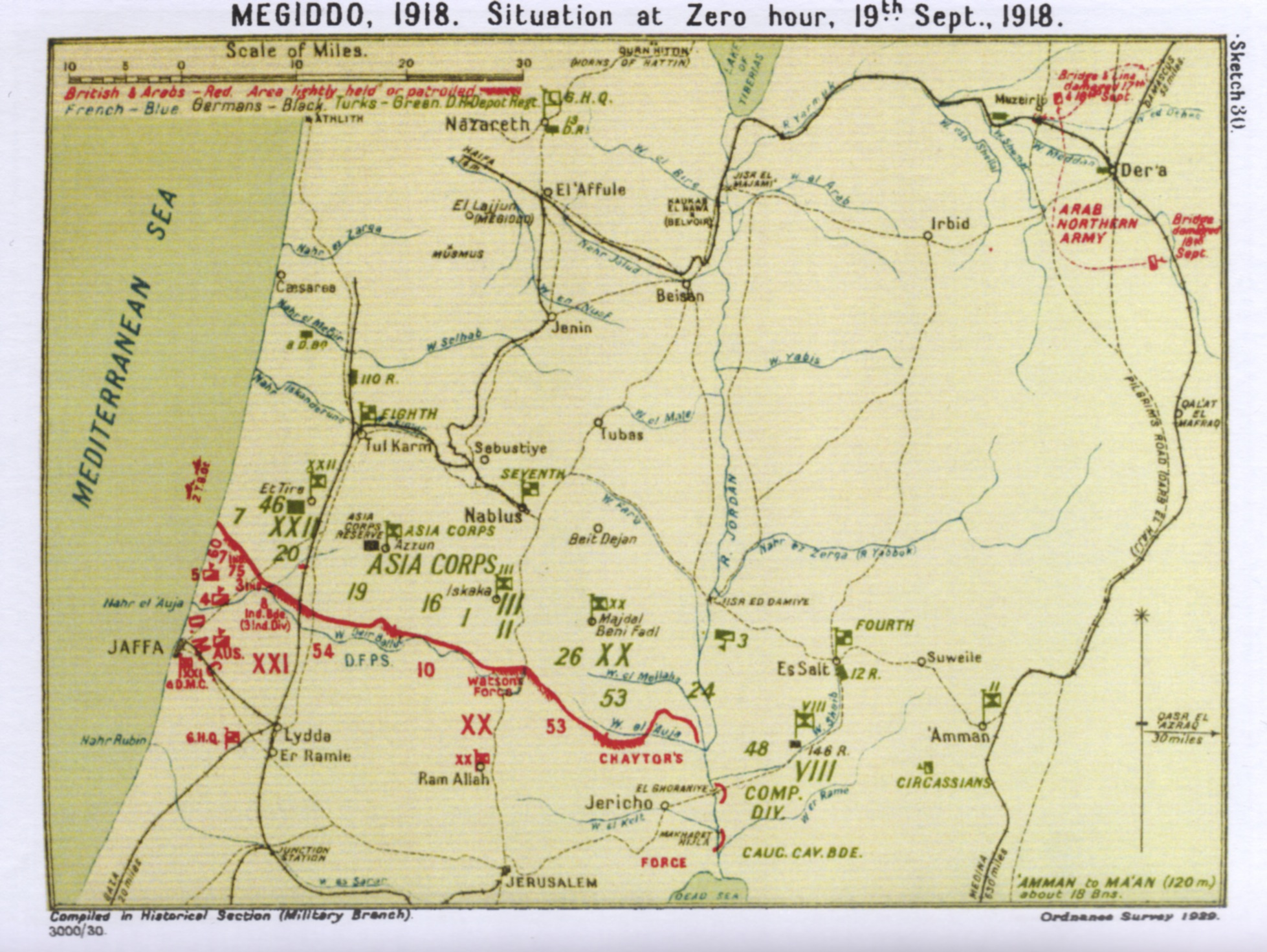
Falls Sketch Map 30 shows position of the front line before the Battle of Megiddo in September 1918

On 8 June 1918 the 7th (Meerut) Division attacked two hills 1 mile (1.6 km) from the sea. Their objectives were quickly taken after the 03:45 assault on 9 June by 21st (Bareilly) Brigade but the Ottoman defenders counterattacked at 06:40 after heavily shelling the Indian brigade; these counterattacks being repulsed. British casualties were 63 killed and 204 wounded; 110 prisoners were captured along with two heavy and five light machine guns. The two hills which had been useful observation posts to the Ottoman Army units were consolidated and remained in British control. (Note: It has been claimed two battalions fought the Arsuf operation. [Wavell 1968, p. 190])

On 13 July an Ottoman attack on the Ra-fat salient held by the 3/3rd Gurkha Rifles (232nd Brigade) was preceded by one of the heaviest bombardments experienced in Palestine. The bombardment, lasting for just over an hour, began at 17:15 and resulted in the village burning but the Gurkhas met the attackers by immediately rushing their defences. The fighting continued until after dark during which 52 soldiers were killed.

During the night of 27 July a successful raid was carried out by five platoons 53rd Sikhs (Frontier Force) (28th Indian Brigade) against Ottoman trenches on "Piffer Ridge" 3 miles (4.8 km) east of the Mediterranean shore at El Haram. The Ottoman garrison was taken by surprise and 33 captured at the cost of four casualties.

After exhaustive training, on the night of 12/13 August 10th (Irish) Division carried out a raid which consisted of a series of attacks on Ottoman defences on the 5,000 yards (4,600 m) long Burj–Ghurabeh Ridge just west of the Jerusalem to Nablus road and about 2,000 yards (1,800 m) from the front line by regiments, brigades, companies and platoons of Indian troops. They were supported by 147 guns and howitzers of the 53rd Divisional Artillery (less two howitzer batteries and the IX British Mountain Artillery Brigade).

One of these attacks on 12 August, was on a 4,000-yard (3,700 m) long, steep-faced ridge west of the Nablus road, which included Khan Gharabe, and formed a part of the XX Corps' front where Ottoman defences were virtually continuous. The opposing line was held by 600 rifles of the Ottoman 33rd Regiment (11th Division). The British and Indian infantry force made a descent of several hundred feet before climbing up steep rocky ground. Despite the Ottoman defences being strongly held and well wired, fierce fighting at close quarters ensued, during which the attacks from both flanks were completely successful. Heavy losses estimated to have been 450 were inflicted on the Ottoman units and 250 prisoners captured.

A wire-cutting bombardment began at 21:55 on 12 August and shortly after the 54th Sikhs (Frontier Force)s and two companies of 6th Prince of Wales's Leinster Regiment were deployed south east of the ridge on the right flank, while the 1/101st Grenadiers and two companies of 6th Prince of Wales's Leinster Regiment at the western end, were over 2.5 miles (4.0 km) away. The two Indian regiments advanced simultaneously, capturing the flanking Ottoman entrenchments then the Prince of Wales's Leinster Regiment companies turned inwards accompanied by a barrage, which also turned inwards from either flank in front of them. Although the two left-hand companies did not reach their objectives the attack was completely successful and the forces withdrawn about 12:15 on 13 August. Captures included 239 prisoners, 14 machine guns and Ottoman casualties were estimated at 450 while the 29th Brigade suffered 107 casualties.

At the same time as the attack was being made to the west of the Nablus road, the 179th and 181st Brigades of the 60th (2/2nd London) Division carried out an attack on a front of 5 miles (8.0 km) east of the Nablus Road mainly without artillery support when a 9 miles (14 km) front from Keen's Knoll to Kh. 'Amuriye was attacked. Table Hill, Bidston Hill, Forfar Hill Fife Knoll, Kh. 'Amuriye and the village of Turmus 'Aya were all successfully attacked although only eight prisoners were captured at a cost of 57 casualties.

== Jordan Valley operations ==
=== Capture of Jericho, February 1918 ===
Allenby wished to extend his right to include Jericho and the northern part of the Dead Sea. In mid February the 53rd (Welsh) and 60th (2/2nd London) Divisions with the 1st Light Horse and the New Zealand Mounted Rifles Brigades attacked German and Ottoman defences to the east of Jerusalem held by their XX Corps' 53rd (Welsh) Division. As the infantry attack on Talat ed Dumm and Jebel Ekteif progressed the mounted brigades moved towards the Jordan Valley from Bethlehem; the New Zealand Mounted Rifles Brigade successfully attacking positions at el Muntar and a strong position protecting Neby Musa while the 1st Light Horse reached the Jordan Valley and entered Jericho.

=== Occupation of the Jordan Valley ===
In February the occupation of the valley began, with the Auckland Mounted Rifles Brigade (New Zealand Mounted Rifles Brigade) remaining to patrol the area, after the Capture of Jericho. During the two Transjordan attacks the Jordan Valley was garrisoned by the Anzac and Australian Mounted Divisions, the 4th and 5th Cavalry Divisions, and the 20th Indian Brigade until September when Chaytor's Force began the Third Transjordan attack by advancing to capture Jisr ed Damieh, Es Salt and Amman. (Note: The two Imperial Service brigades fielded by Indian Princely States – the 32nd (Imperial Service) Brigade and the 15th (Imperial Service) Cavalry Brigade – had seen service in the theatre since 1914; from the defence of the Suez Canal onwards. [Falls 1930, Vol. 2, part II, p. 424])

=== First Transjordan advance ===
Before Jericho had been captured Allenby was already planning to push across the Jordan River and 'throw a big raid past Salt against the Hedjaz Railway.' The First Attack on Amman, as it is known to the British, was referred to by the Ottoman Army as the First Battle of the Jordan. It took place between 21 and 30 March.

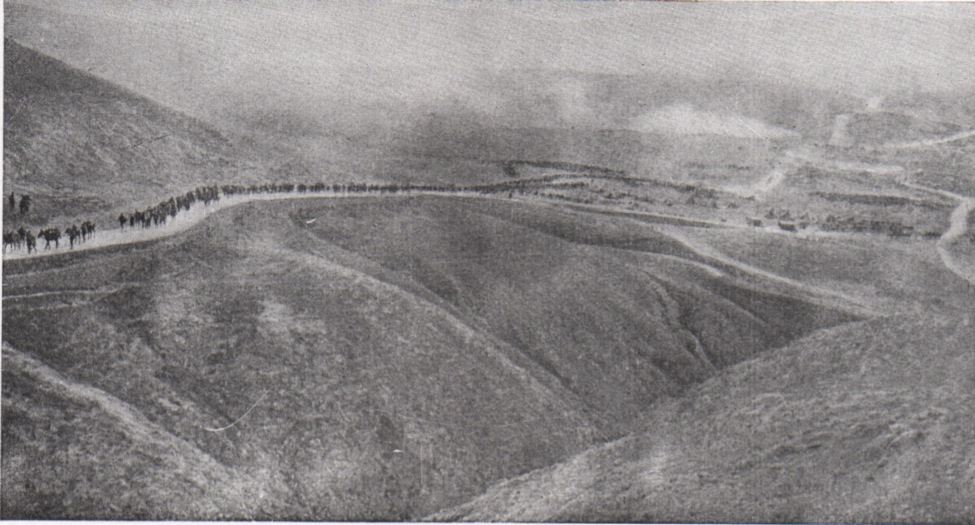
The 60th (2/2nd London) Division marching from Jerusalem to the Jordan Valley, March 1918

Shea's Force consisting of the 60th (2/2nd London) and the Anzac Mounted Divisions successfully forced a crossing of the Jordan River, occupied Es Salt, attacked Amman and partly destroyed sections of the Hedjaz Railway some 30–40 miles (48–64 km) east of Jericho.

The Ottoman 48th Infantry Division together with the 3rd and 46th Assault Companies and the German 703rd Infantry Battalion successfully defended Amman and stopped the advance of Shea's Force. With his lines of communication threatened by 2,000 reinforcements moving towards Es Salt from the north the successful retirement was eventually ordered, even though the principal objective; the destruction of a large viaduct at Amman had not succeeded.

The retirement was complete by the evening of 2 April leaving the only territorial gains two bridgeheads at Ghoraniye and Makhadet Hajla. This was the first defeat of units of the Egyptian Expeditionary Force since the Second Battle of Gaza in April 1917. Along with the Second Transjordan attack on Es Salt the following month, these two attacks focused attention away from the Mediterranean coastal sector of the line where the British Empire attack in September 1918 would be comprehensively successful.

=== Second Transjordan advance ===
Following the unsuccessful first Transjordan attack on Amman by Shea's force, Allenby ordered a reluctant Chauvel to attack Shunet Nimrin and Es Salt with a force one third larger than that which attacked Amman. But in the five weeks between these two operations British GHQ estimated the German and Ottoman forces in the area had doubled.

The second Transjordan attack was equally unsuccessful; risked the capture of one of Allenby's mounted divisions but is widely accepted as fulfilling his strategic aim of focusing his opponent's attention on the Transjordan area and away from the Mediterranean coast where he would make a successful breakthrough in September. (Note: In a letter to Wigram dated 5 May Allenby describes the visit of the Duke of Connaught and in detail his campaign from the Defence of Jerusalem in late December onwards. [Hughes 2004, pp. 148–53])

=== German and Ottoman attack ===
On 14 July two attacks were made by German and Ottoman forces; one in the hills on a salient held by Australian Light Horse which protected front line positions in the valley, where the mainly German force was routed. A second operation was to the east of the Jordan River on the plain, where an Ottoman cavalry brigade had deployed six regiments to attack the El Hinu and Makhadet Hijla bridgeheads. They were attacked by Indian lancers and routed.

== Focus moves to the Western Front ==
The German spring offensive was launched by Ludendorff on the Western Front the same day the First Transjordan attack on Amman began and completely eclipsed its failure. The powerful assault launched on both sides of the Somme by a force of 750,000 collapsed the British front in Picardy held by just 300,000 men. Gough's Fifth Army was forced back almost to Amiens. On one day; 23 March German forces advanced 12 miles (19 km) and captured 600 guns; in total the British losing 1,000 guns and 160,000 men, suffering the worst defeat of the war. The British War Cabinet recognised at once that the overthrow of the Ottoman Empire must be at least postponed.

The effect of this offensive on the Palestine campaign was described by Allenby on 1 April 1918: "Here, I have raided the Hedjaz railway 40 miles East of Jordan & have done much damage but my little show dwindles now into a very insufficient [insignificant] affair in comparison with events in Europe." Overnight Palestine went from being the British government's first priority to a "side show."

=== Reorganisation of EEF infantry ===
The 52nd (Lowland) Division was sent to France in early April. The 74th (Yeomanry) Division along with nine British infantry battalions from each of the 10th, 53rd, 60th and 75th Divisions were sent to France, between May and August 1918. What remained of the divisions were reinforced by British Indian Army battalions to reform the divisions. (Note: The 75th Division had received the first Indian battalions in June 1917. ["75th Division". The Long Long Trail.] The division's 232nd and 233rd Brigades were formed in April and May 1917 from four British battalions. The 234th Brigade only had two British battalions until two Indian battalions joined in July and September 1917, when it was formed. [75th Division, The Long Long Trail] Other sources claim on establishment the 75th Division was made up of Territorial and Indian battalions. [Falls 1930, Vol. 1, p. 319]) Infantry brigades were reformed with one British battalion and three British Indian Army battalions, except one brigade in the 53rd Division which consisted of one South African and three British Indian Army battalions.

By April 1918, 35 Indian infantry and two Indian pioneer battalions were preparing to move to Palestine. Those battalions with numbers from 150 upwards, were formed by removing complete companies from experienced regiments then serving in Mesopotamia to form new battalions. (Note: The 2/151st Indian Infantry, was one such battalion formed from one company each from the 56th Punjabi Rifles, the 51st, 52nd and 53rd Sikhs. One regiment, the 101st Grenadiers, formed a second battalion by dividing itself into two with two experienced and two new companies in each battalion. [Roy 2011, p. 174]) The parent battalions also supplied first line transport and experienced officers with war-time service. The 198 men transferred from the 38th Dogras to the 3/151st Indian Infantry, included the commanding officer, two other British and four Indian officers. The sepoys transferred were also very experienced. In September 1918 when the 2/151st Indian Infantry provided an honour guard for Allenby, among the men on parade were some who had served on five different fronts since 1914, and in eight pre-war campaigns. Not all of these Indian battalions served in the infantry divisions, because some were employed in defence of the lines of communication.

The complexity of the reorganisation and reformation of these battalions was not without consequences. Of the 54 British Indian Army battalions deployed to Palestine, 22 had recent experience of combat, but had each lost an experienced company, which had been replaced by recruits. Ten battalions were formed from experienced troops who had never fought or trained together. The other 22 had not seen any prior service in the war, in total almost a third of the troops were recruits. Within 44 British Indian Army battalions, the "junior British officers were green, and most could not speak Hindustani. In one battalion, only one Indian officer spoke English and only two British officers could communicate with their men."

Two British Indian Army divisions arrived in January and April 1918 from the Mesopotamia campaign. They were the 7th (Meerut) Division followed by the 3rd (Lahore) Division. (Note: Allenby had been informed after the capture of Jerusalem in December 1917 that "the 7th Indian Division would arrive from Mesopotamia" and on 1 April it relieved the 52nd (Lowland) Division which sailed for France. The "3rd Indian Division" arrived from Mesopotamia on 14 April 1918. [Falls 1930, Vol. 2, pp. 293, 350, 413]) Only the 54th (East Anglian) Division remained, as previously, an all British division.

=== Reorganisation of EEF cavalry ===
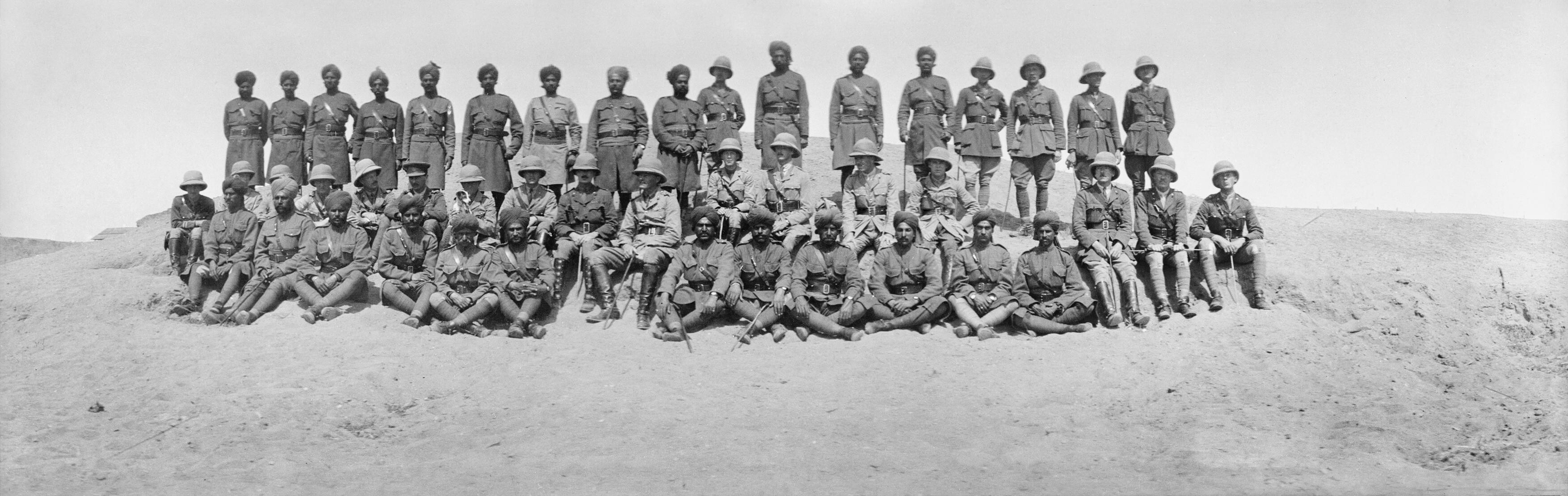
British and Indian officers of the 18th Lancers at Tel el Kebir on arrival from France in April 1918

The British Indian Army's 4th and 5th Cavalry Divisions, which had fought on the Western Front since 1914, were disbanded. They were reformed in the Middle East, with yeomanry regiments replacing British regular cavalry regiments, which remained on the Western Front. Nine British yeomanry regiments from the Yeomanry Mounted Division (Desert Mounted Corps) were sent to France to reinforce the British Expeditionary Force fighting the Spring Offensive.

Three of the remaining yeomanry regiments, the 1/1st Dorset Yeomanry, the 1/1st County of London Yeomanry, and the 1/1st Staffordshire Yeomanry, which had previously formed part of the 6th, 8th and 22nd Mounted Brigades, along with newly arrived British Indian Army units transferred from France, formed the 4th Cavalry Division. Another two of the remaining yeomanry regiments, the 1/1st Royal Gloucestershire Hussars and 1/1st Sherwood Rangers Yeomanry which had belonged to the 5th and 7th Mounted Brigades, with newly arrived British Indian Army units transferred from France, and the renamed 15th (Imperial Service) Cavalry Brigade, formed the 5th Cavalry Division. The 15th (Imperial Service) Cavalry Brigade had served during the Ottoman Raid on Suez Canal and in the Sinai and Palestine since December 1914, as the Imperial Service Cavalry Brigade. Both the 4th and 5th Cavalry Divisions were assigned to the Desert Mounted Corps which had lost the Yeomanry Cavalry Division during the reorganisation.

Five of the six brigades in the 4th and 5th Cavalry Divisions were composed of one British yeomanry and two Indian cavalry regiments. The sixth brigade (in the 5th Cavalry Division), the 15th (Imperial Service) Cavalry Brigade, consisted of three regiments of Imperial Service Troops, which represented and were wholly maintained by the Indian Princely states of Jodhpur, Mysore and Hyderabad. Eight of the 18 regiments in the six brigades were armed with and called lancers. (Note: See Indian Army during World War I for an image of Indian lancers, and for an illustration of a fully armed lancer with sword, lance, rifle, bayonet and gas mask, see Chappell's "Men at Arms Series British Cavalry Equipment 1800–1941" illustration G 1.) The Australian Mounted Division's 5th Mounted Brigade was also dismounted and sent to reinforce the British Expeditionary Force in France. It was replaced by the newly formed 5th Light Horse Brigade which consisted of the 14th and 15th Light Horse Regiments, formed from Australians transferred from the Imperial Camel Corps Brigade and the French Régiment Mixte de Marche de Cavalerie. Completing this division, the 3rd and 4th Light Horse Brigades consisted of three light horse regiments made up of a headquarters and three squadrons. To conform with the 5th Light Horse Brigade, the 522 troopers in each of these regiments were armed with swords instead of bayonets, and Lee–Enfield rifles.

=== Yildirim Army Group ===
Ottoman Force June 1918
	Rifles	Sabres	Machine guns	Art.Rifles [sic]
Fourth Army	8,050	2,375	221	30
Seventh Army	12,850	750	289	28
Eighth Army	15,870	1,000	314	1,309
North Palestine Line of Communications	950	–	6	–

The Ottoman armies in the Yildirim Army Group had been weakened by considerable losses suffered between 31 October and 31 December 1917. The Seventh Army lost 110 officers and 1,886 men killed, 213 officers and 5,488 men wounded, 79 officers and 393 men captured and 183 officers and 4,233 men were missing. This army had also lost 7,305 rifles, 22 light and 73 heavy machine guns and 29 guns. The Eighth Army reported 2,384 wounded but no rifles, machine guns or artillery guns missing. Total Ottoman casualties for the period were 25,337 killed, wounded, captured or missing while British losses for the same period amounted to 18,000 men. During the same period the British reported 70 officers and 1,474 men killed, 118 officers and 3,163 men wounded, 95 officers and 5,868 men captured and 97 officers and 4,877 men missing. This was in spite of odds in favour of the British of well over two to one in infantry and eight to one in cavalry as well as a massive artillery, logistical and naval superiority. It is therefore remarkable that any Ottoman units survived the onslaught and made the Ottoman fighting withdrawal under pressure a great accomplishment.

However, the Yildirim Army Group was still a competent fighting force at the beginning of 1918. Every infantry division which had fought at Beersheba on 31 October was intact and still fighting, although some were considerably reduced in strength. To make up for these losses reinforcements had arrived in December 1917. The 2nd Caucasian Cavalry Division and the 1st Infantry Division had been transferred to Palestine from the Caucasus. Indeed, at the end of the Jerusalem campaign the Ottoman soldiers appeared the toughest, most obdurate and most professional of fighters. Training continued and in early February, the 20th Infantry Regiment at regimental level received intensive training in day and night fortification and battle drill.

While Enver Pasa and the Ottoman General Staff remained focused on the offensive, the Ottoman armies remained aggressive and confident. Their front line was held by the Eighth Army with headquarters at Tul Keram defending the Mediterranean coastal sector, the Seventh Army with headquarters at Nablus defending the Judean Hills sector while the Fourth Army with headquarters at Amman (until after the first Transjordan attack on Amman when its headquarters was moved forward to Es Salt) defended the Transjordan sector. But German air superiority ended with the arrival of the S.E.5.a and Bristol fighters, one of which destroyed three German Albatros scouts on 12 December. From January 1918 these British planes increasingly dominated the skies.

The Ottoman high command was dissatisfied with von Falkenhayn, the commander of the Yildirim Army Group in Palestine. He was seen to have been responsible for the defeat at Beersheba and his refusal to allow Ottoman staff officers to participate in planning combat operations rankled. Enver Pasa replaced him on 19 February with General Otto Liman von Sanders and under this new leader, the established 'active, flexible defence' style was changed to a more unyielding defence.

==== Arrival of a new German commander ====
Liman von Sanders took over command of the Ottoman Army in Palestine from von Falkenhayn on 1 March 1918. On arrival it was apparent to him that the Ottoman front line was particularly weak west of the Jordan and he took immediate action to strengthen both flanks by a redistribution of his forces.

In May 1918, during the lull in fighting after the two Transjordan attacks, from his headquarters at Nazareth, Liman took the opportunity to reorganise the Ottoman army forces in Palestine. (Note: The reorganisation Bruce describes had not changed since the Battle of Mughar Ridge. The Seventh and Eighth Armies still held a defensive line west of the Jordan, while the Fourth Army remained east of the Jordan.) The Eighth Army, which was headquartered at Tul Keram under the command of Djevad Pasha (Kress von Kressenstein's successor), consisted of the XXII Corps (7th, 20th and 46th Divisions) and the Asiatic Corps (16th and 19th Divisions, 701st, 702nd and 703rd German Battalions). This army held a line running eastwards from the Mediterranean shore for about 20 miles (32 km) into the hills at Furkhah. Mustafa Kemal Pasha's (Fevzi's successor) Seventh Army, whose headquarters were at Nablus, consisted of the III Corps (1st and 11th Divisions) and XXIII Corps (26th and 53rd Divisions), and held the rest of the Ottoman line eastwards from Furkhah to the River Jordan; this represented a front of about 20 miles (32 km), with its main strength on both sides of the Jerusalem to Nablus road.

While holding the front line on the Jordan River the 48th Infantry Division continued training, conducting courses on battle tactics, machine guns, hand grenades, and flame throwers. When the 37th Infantry Division arrived from the Caucasus, the division's troops undertook a two-week course on the use of stick grenades near Nablus.

== Arab attacks ==
Arab attacks were made on Maan between 15 and 17 April. During these actions, they captured 70 prisoners and two machine guns, and temporarily occupied the railway station, but failed to capture the main position.

== Megiddo offensive ==
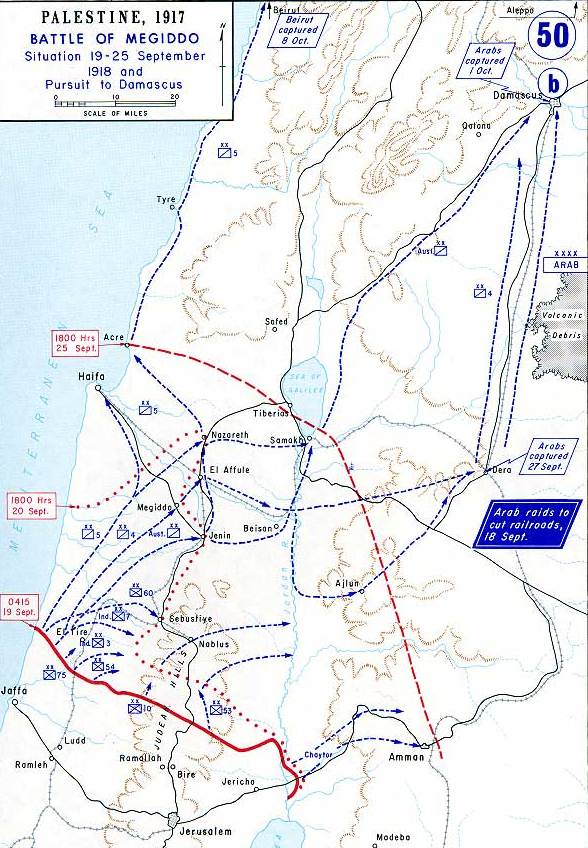
Allenby's final attack, September 1918

As the dry season approached Allenby intended to advance to secure Tiberias, Haifa and the Yarmuk Valley towards Hauran, the Sea of Galilee and Damascus. The peoples inhabiting the region of the Sharon battlefield varied greatly in their background, religious beliefs and political outlook. Living from Jericho northwards, were indigenous Jews in Samaria, Moravians in Galilee [probably a confusion between two German Protestant groups, the Moravian Brethren who ran a leppers asylum in Jerusalem, and the much more numerous Templers, who had settled mainly in the Galilee], some Druze, Shi'a Metawals and a few Nussiri (pagans). In the east were the Bedouin. In Haifa town, about half the population was Muslim and in Acre almost all were Muslim. On the Esdraelon Plain as far as Beisan were Sunni Arabs and one new Jewish colony near Afulah. Muslims, Christians and Jews lived in the foothill country of Northern Galilee. Christians of at least five denominations formed a large majority in and around Nazareth's towns. The inhabitants of the eastern part of the Northern Galilee area were predominantly indigenous Jews, who had always inhabited Tiberias and Safed. In the region of the Nablus battlefield, the inhabitants from Beersheba to Jericho were also quite diverse. The population was mainly Arab of the Sunni branch of Islam, with some Jews and Christians. At Nablus, they were almost exclusively Moslems excepting the less than 200 members of the Samaritan sect of original Jews. To the east of the Jordan Valley in the Es Salt district were Syrian and Greek Orthodox Christians, and near Amman, Circassians and Turkmans.

Allenby finally launched his long-delayed attack on 19 September 1918. The campaign has been called the Battle of Megiddo (which is a transliteration of the Hebrew name of an ancient town known in the west as Armageddon). The British made major efforts to deceive the Ottoman Army as to their actual intended target of operations. This effort was successful and the Ottoman Army was taken by surprise when the British suddenly attacked Megiddo. As the Ottoman troops started a full-scale retreat, the Royal Air Force bombed the fleeing columns of men from the air and within a week, the Ottoman army in Palestine ceased to exist as a military force.

Despite its name, the actual battlefield of the Battle of Megiddo (1918) was relatively far from the site of the Biblical city. The emphasis on using the name "Megiddo" was, in part, related to the overall propaganda effort to link victory in the Middle-East to the domestically well-known locations from the Bible, and thus boost British morale at home. The battle for "Armageddon" did not receive nearly the attention which might have been expected, however, with Eiten Bar-Yosef stating that, "[e]ven Cyril Falls’s Armageddon 1918 (1964), a detailed study of Allenby’s advance, does not elaborate on the metaphor, and it is not difficult to see why: Allenby’s swift progress up to Damascus was certainly not the bloody, colossal, definitive clash envisioned in John’s Revelation; that was taking place in the trenches of the Western Front."

A number of historians have claimed the offensive which resulted in the capture of the Gaza to Beersheba line and Jerusalem, and the Megiddo operation were similar. In this regard, it is argued that they were both a cavalry envelopment of the Ottoman flank, and that the breakthroughs both came at unexpected locations. At Gaza–Beersheba, the breakthrough occurred at the eastern end of the front line at Beersheba instead of Gaza as the Ottomans had expected, while at Megiddo the breakthrough occurred on the Mediterranean coast at the western end of the front line when it was expected across the Jordan. (Note: These two victories resulted in unexpectedly large captures of Ottoman territory and prisoners.)

== Syrian campaign ==
=== Pursuit to Damascus ===
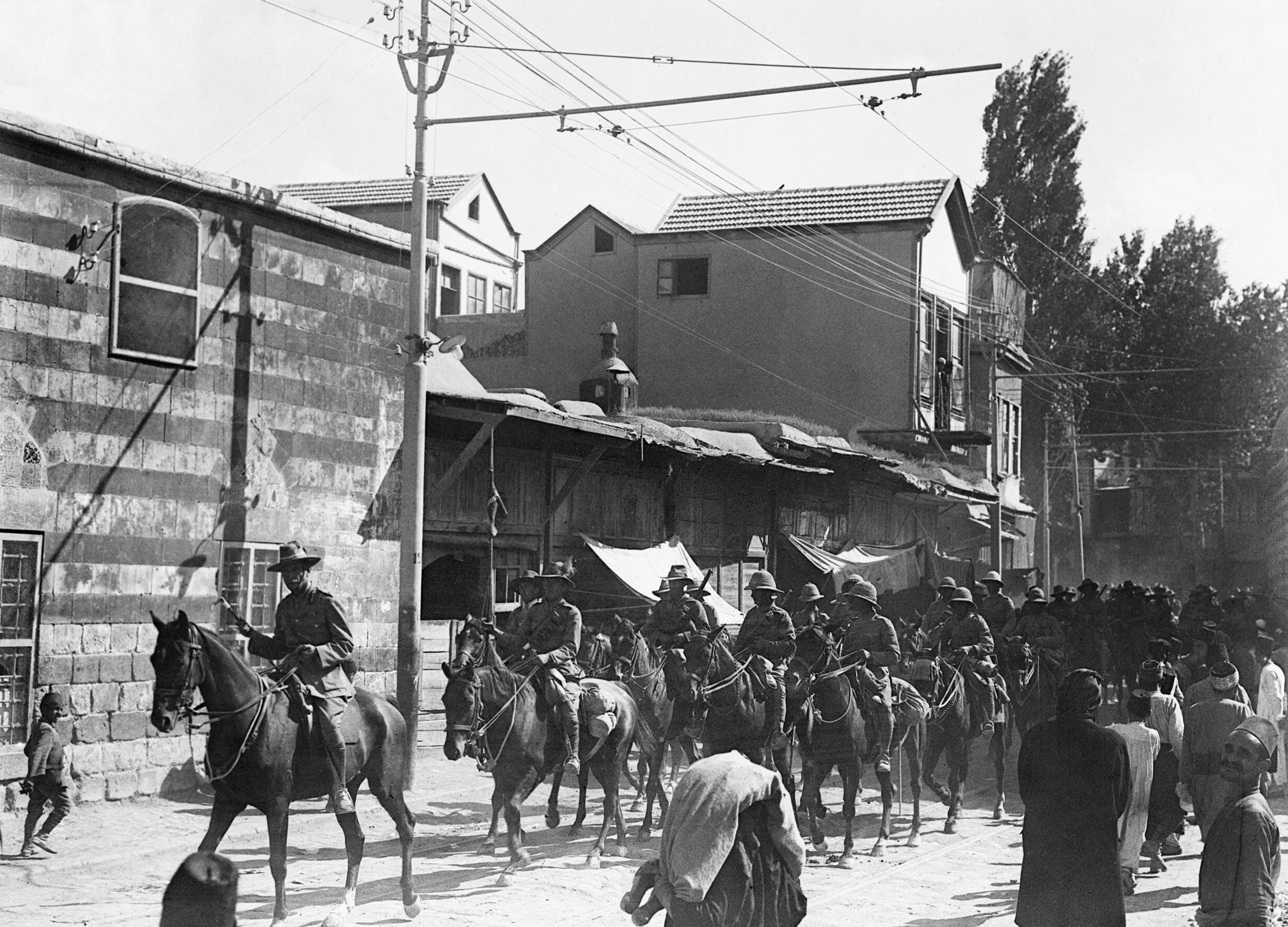
Lieutenant General Chauvel leading march through Damascus by Australian, British, French, Indian and New Zealand units, 2 October 1918

The war in Palestine was over, but in Syria it lasted for a further month. The ultimate goal of Allenby's and Feisal's armies was Damascus. Two separate Allied columns marched towards Damascus. The first, composed mainly of Australian and Indian cavalry, approached from Galilee, while the other column, consisting of Indian cavalry and the ad hoc militia following T. E. Lawrence, travelled northwards along the Hejaz Railway. Australian Light Horse troops marched unopposed into Damascus on 1 October 1918, despite the presence of some 12,000 Ottoman soldiers at Baramke Barracks. Major Olden of the Australian 10th Light Horse Regiment received the official surrender of the city at 7 am at the Serai. Later that day, Lawrence's irregulars entered Damascus.

The inhabitants of the region varied greatly in their background, religious beliefs and political outlook. In the Eastern Hauran, the bulk of the population were Druze, while in the Jaulan, more Circassians, Metawala and some Algerian colonists were living. The southern Jaulan district was poor and rocky, supporting a very small population and groups of nomads from the Wuld Ali in the eastern desert, while the north is more fertile with a large Circassian colony in and around Kuneitra. The north–west Jaulan district contains some Metawala villages and some Algerian colonies in the east, introduced by the Emir Abdul Qadir after he had taken refuge in Damascus in the 1850s. In between these are settled Arabs similar to those in the Nukra plain; while in the east were Bedouin Arabs.

The advances to Amman, during the Third Transjordan attack of the Battle of Megiddo, and to Damascus towards the end of the war, resulted in the highest incidence of malaria "that has ever been suffered by Australian forces."

=== Capture of Aleppo ===
Aleppo, the third largest city in the Ottoman Empire, was captured on 25 October. The Ottoman government was quite prepared to sacrifice these non-Turkish provinces without surrendering. Indeed, while this battle was raging, the Ottoman Empire sent an expeditionary force into Russia to enlarge the ethnic Turkish elements of the empire. It was only after the surrender of Bulgaria, which put Ottoman Empire into a vulnerable position for invasion, that the Ottoman government was compelled to sign an armistice at Mudros on 30 October 1918, and surrendered outright two days later.

== Summary ==
The British and their Dominions suffered a total of 51,451 battle casualties: 12,873 killed/missing, 37,193 wounded, and 1,385 captured. An additional 503,377 were hospitalized as non-battle casualties, mostly from disease; 5,981 of these died, and most of the rest were returned to duty. It is unknown how many of the non-battle casualties were in serious enough condition to require evacuation out of theater, though comparison to the Mesopotamia campaign (where 19% were evacuated) would suggest the number is around 100,000. Indian non-battle casualties are unknown, while Indian battle casualties were 10,526: 3,842 dead, 6,519 wounded, and 165 missing/captured.

Total Ottoman losses are harder to estimate but almost certainly much larger: an entire army was lost in the fighting and the Ottoman Empire poured a vast number of troops into the front over the three years of combat. American historian Edward J. Erickson, with access to the Ottoman Archives, attempted to estimate Ottoman battle casualties from this campaign in 2001. He did not attempt to estimate losses due to disease for this campaign, but noted that the Ottomans had some 2.66 times the number of disease deaths as KIA throughout the war (466,759 v 175,220), with the highest ratio of non-battle casualties to battle casualties being found in the Caucasus and Mesopotamia. His estimates for Ottoman battle casualties by battle were as follows:

- Sinai 1915: 1,700 (192 KIA, 381 WIA, 727 MIA, 400 POW)
- Sinai 1916: 1,000 (250 KIA, 750 WIA)
- 1st Gaza 1917: 1,650 (300 KIA, 750 WIA, 600 POW)
- 2nd Gaza 1917: 1,660 (82 KIA, 1,336 WIA, 242 MIA)
- 3rd Gaza/Jerusalem 1917: 28,057 (3,540 KIA, 8,982 WIA, 9,100 MIA, 6,435 POW)
- 2nd Jordan 1918: 3,000 (1,000 KIA, 2,000 WIA)
- Megiddo/Syria 1918: 101,300 (10,000 KIA, 20,000 WIA, 71,300 POW)

A total of 138,367 battle casualties (15,364 KIA, 34,199 WIA, 10,069 MIA, 78,735 POW). The WIA figures only include irrecoverable losses (crippled or later died of wounds). Going by the Erickson's estimates, total wounded outnumbered seriously wounded by 2.5:1 for the war. Applying that same ratio to the Sinai and Palestine campaign produces a total battle casualty count of about 189,600 (15,364 KIA, 10,069 MIA, 85,497 WIA, 78,735 POW). Furthermore, his listed ratio of disease deaths to KIA implies about 40,900 disease deaths in Sinai-Palestine. This would add up to total casualties of roughly 230,500 (15,364 KIA, 10,069 MIA, 40,900 died of disease, 85,497 WIA/DOW, 78,735 POW).

Despite the uncertainty of casualty counts, the historical consequences of this campaign are easy to discern. The British conquest of Palestine led directly to the British mandate over Palestine and the Trans-Jordan which, in turn, paved the way for the creation of the states of Israel and Jordan.

== See also ==
- Bund der Asienkämpfer

== Notes ==
Footnotes

Citations
