= Capture of Afulah and Beisan =

Part of the Middle Eastern theatre of World War I

Capture of Afula and Beisan
- Part of the Middle Eastern theatre of World War I
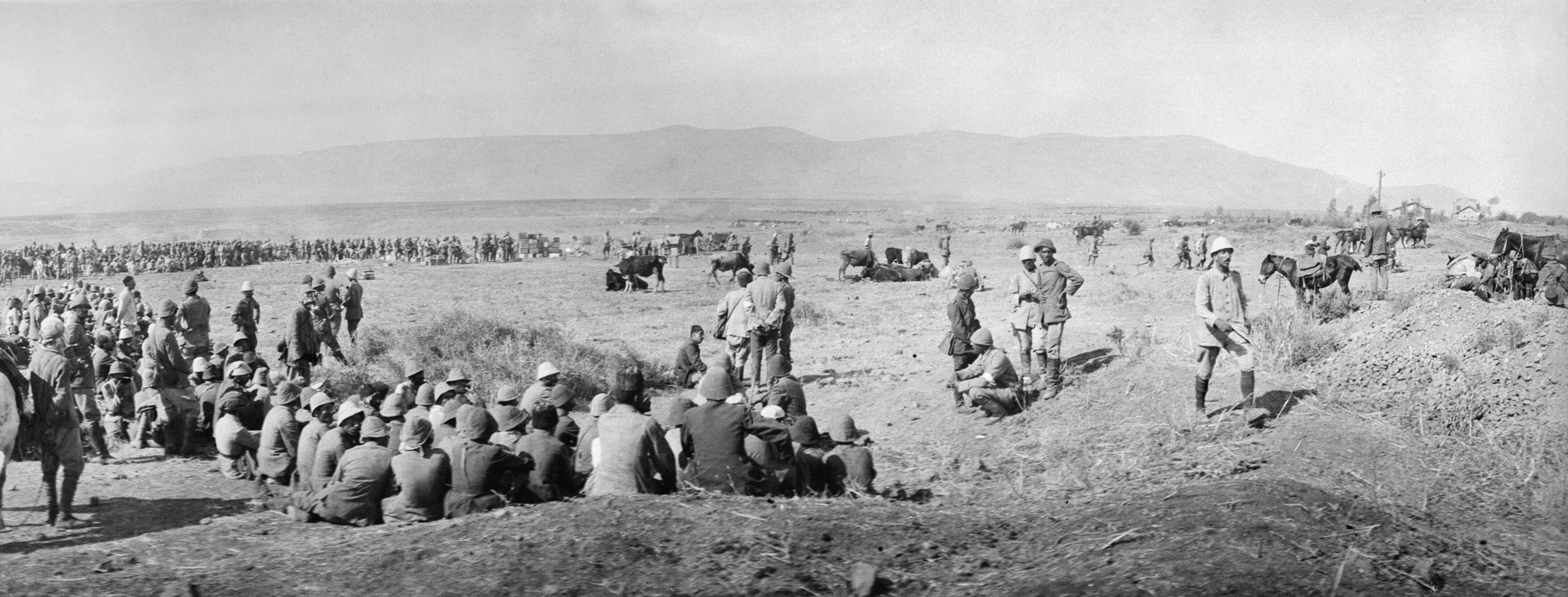
- 6,000 Ottoman prisoners at Beisan receiving rations on 24 September with commander of 16th Division seated on right wearing white arm bands
Date	20 September 1918
Location	Afula in the centre of the Esdraelon Plain (Jezreel Valley) and Beisan on its eastern edge near the Jordan River
Result	British victory

Belligerents
British Empire: United Kingdom; India; Australia	Ottoman Empire; German Empire

Commanders and leaders
(United Kingdom of Great Britain and Ireland) Edmund Allenby (Australia) Harry Chauvel (British Empire) George Barrow	(Ottoman Empire) Fevsi Pasha; (German Empire) Otto Liman von Sanders

Units involved
Egyptian Expeditionary Force; Desert Mounted Corps; 4th Cavalry Division	Yildirim Army Group's 13th Depot Regiment, military police with 12 machine guns; Afula and Beisan garrisons

The Capture of Afula and Beisan occurred on 20 September 1918, during the Battle of Sharon which together with the Nablus, formed the set piece Battle of Megiddo fought during the last months of the Sinai and Palestine Campaign of the First World War. During the cavalry phase of the Battle of Sharon, the 4th Cavalry Division of the Desert Mounted Corps attacked and captured the main communications hub at Afula, located in the centre of the Esdraelon Plain (also known as the Jezreel Valley and the plain of Armageddon), and Beisan on the plain's eastern edge near the Jordan River, some 40–50 miles (64–80 km) behind the front line in the Judean Hills.

Infantry attacks by the British Empires XXI Corps had begun the Battle of Sharon on 19 September, along an almost continuous trench line from the Mediterranean across the Plain of Sharon and into the foothills of the Judean Hills. These attacks captured the Ottoman front line at Tulkarm, Tabsor, and Arara, in the process outflanking and decimating the Ottoman Eighth Army on the coast. During the attack on Tulkarm, the infantry created a gap in the Ottoman front line defences, through which cavalry from General Edmund Allenby's Egyptian Expeditionary Force (EEF) rode north. The three cavalry divisions in the Desert Mounted Corps successfully captured the Ottoman Seventh and Eighth Armies' lines of communication across the Esdraelon Plain from their headquarters in the Judean Hills.

The Desert Mounted Corps began the advance riding up the Plain of Sharon to Liktera, on 19 September where they attacked and captured an entrenched line barring their advance. Subsequently, the Corps crossed the Mount Carmel Range by the Musmus Pass and the northern Shushu Pass, during the night of 19/20 September. As the 4th Cavalry Division rode out across the Esdraelon Plain on the morning of 20 September, towards their primary objective; the main communications hub at Afula, they attacked and captured a force sent from Yildirim Army Group headquarters at Nazareth, to hold and bar the Musmus Pass, which had failed to get into position. Afula was captured by units from both the 5th and the 4th Cavalry Divisions shortly after. Leaving the 5th Cavalry Division and one regiments at Afula, the 4th Cavalry Division advanced to capture Beisan and later in the day, the regiment advanced directly from Afula to occupy the railway bridges at Jisr Majami, across the Jordan and Yarmuk Rivers. The capture of Jenin on the southern edge of the Esdraelon Plain, also blocked the main line of retreat to Damascus from the Judean Hills. The General Headquarters of the Yildirim Army Group commanded by General Otto Liman von Sanders at Nazareth was captured the next day, and Haifa two days later.

Several days later while garrisoning Beisan, the 4th Cavalry Division advanced southwards down the Jordan River to close a 20 miles (32 km) long gap, through which the retreating remnants of the Seventh and Eighth Armies had been escaping. They successfully attacked and captured several fords during 23 and 24 September, to completely cut off all remaining Ottoman soldiers in the Judean Hills. By the end of the month, one Ottoman army had been destroyed, while the remnants of two others were in retreat to Damascus after the German rearguard at Samakh was captured by Australian Light Horsemen on 25 September. Damascus was captured on 1 October, and by the time the Armistice of Mudros between the Allies and the Ottoman Empire was signed at the end of October, fighting for Aleppo was underway.

== Background ==
=== Esdraelon Plain ===
The Esdraelon Plain stretches from Lejjun in the west to Nazareth 10 miles (16 km) to the north, in the foothills of the Galilean Hills, through Afula in the centre of the plain, to Beisan on its eastern edge and close to the Jordan River, and then to Jenin on the southern edge of the plain, at the foot of the Judean Hills.

Near Lejjun, the remains of the ancient fortress of Megiddo on Tell al Mutesellim dominate the entry to the plain from the Musmus Pass. Here a relatively small garrison could control the routes across the Esdraelon Plain where the armies of Egyptians, Romans, Mongols, Arabs, and Crusaders who had fought Saladin near Afula during the Battle of Al-Fule, as well as of Napoleon, had marched and fought towards Nazareth, the Galilean Hills, and Damascus.

Aerial reconnaissance reported that no defensive works of any kind had been identified on the plain or covering the approaches to it, apart from German troops, garrisoned at the Yildirim Army Group headquarters of Otto Liman von Sanders at Nazareth. (Note: The only available German and Ottoman sources are Liman von Sanders' memoir and the Asia Corps' war diary. Ottoman army and corps records seem to have disappeared during their retreat. [Falls 1930 Vol. 2 pp. 494–5]) At 12:30 on 19 September Liman von Sanders ordered the 13th Depot Regiment at Nazareth and the military police, a total of six companies and 12 machine guns, to occupy Lejjun and defend the Musmus Pass.

=== Deployment ===
The Desert Mounted Corps, commanded by the Australian Lieutenant General Sir Harry Chauvel, was made up of the 4th, and the 5th Cavalry Divisions, and the Australian Mounted Division. (Note: The Anzac Mounted Division was temporarily detached to Chaytor's Force.)

Each division consisted of three cavalry brigades, with three regiments to each brigade and support troops. The regiments consisted of a headquarters and three squadrons; 522 men and horses in each regiment. Five of the six brigades in the 4th and 5th Cavalry Divisions consisted of one British yeomanry regiment and two British Indian Army cavalry regiments one of which was usually lancers, the sixth brigade being the lancers of the 15th Imperial Service Cavalry Brigade. Some of the yeomanry regiments were also armed with the lance in addition to their swords, rifles, and bayonets, while the Australian Mounted Division was armed with swords, .303 rifles and bayonets. (Note: For an illustration of a Dragoon Guard armed with the sword, lance, rifle and bayonet see Chappell's "Men at Arms Series British Cavalry Equipment 1800–1941", illustration G 1.)

The 4th Cavalry Division consisted of the 10th, 11th and 12th Cavalry Brigades, the 5th Cavalry Division was made up of the 13th, 14th and 15th Cavalry Brigades and the Australian Mounted Division was made up of the 3rd, 4th and 5th Light Horse Brigades. The 5th Light Horse Brigade, was temporarily attached to the 60th Division for the Battle of Tulkarm. These mounted units were supported by machine gun squadrons, three artillery batteries from the Royal Horse Artillery or Honourable Artillery Company, and light armoured car units; two Light Armoured Motor Batteries, and two Light Car Patrols.

What a mass of horses & transport. Stand–to all night, lie down with our equipment on the horses being hooked–up to the wagons ...

— Diary of James Calderwood Jones, Lowland Brigade RFA ammunition column, 21:00 18 September 1918

The Desert Mounted Corps concentrated near Ramleh, Ludd (Lydda), and Jaffa, where they dumped surplus equipment in preparation for their advance before moving up behind the XXI Corps' infantry divisions, assembled near the Mediterranean coast. By 17 September, the 5th Cavalry Division, which would lead the Desert Mounted Corps' advance, was deployed north-west of Sarona 8 miles (13 km) from the front line, with the 4th Cavalry Division in orange groves east of Sarona, 10 miles (16 km) from the front, and the Australian Mounted Division in reserve near Ramleh and Ludd 17 miles (27 km) from the front line.

All movement had been restricted to night time, culminating in a general move forwards on the eve of battle. On the night of 18/19 September, the 4th and 5th Cavalry Divisions moved forward behind the infantry, while the Australian Mounted Division moved up to Sarona. Here the three divisions concentrated, with their supplies carried in massed horse-drawn transport and on long camel trains, clogging the roads. The divisions carried one iron ration and two days' special emergency rations per man, and 21 pounds (9.5 kg) of grain per horse, all carried on the horse, with an additional day's grain per horse carried on the first line transport limbered wagons.

=== Desert Mounted Corps objectives ===
The three lowlands of the Plain of Sharon, the Esdraelon Plain 40 miles (64 km) behind the Ottoman front line, and the Jordan River Valley formed a semicircle to the north and around the Ottoman positions in the Judean Hills, held by the Seventh and Eighth Armies. After the successful infantry breakthrough, the three cavalry divisions were to ride through the gap northwards up the coastal Plain of Sharon, then eastwards across the Esdraelon Plain to the Jordan River, to cut off the Ottoman forces in the Judean Hills.

During the initial cavalry advance up the coastal Plain of Sharon to Litera on Nahr el Mefjir, the Desert Mounted Corps were to advance while "strictly disregarding any enemy forces that did not directly bar its path." They were to turn north-east across the Mount Carmel Range through two passes onto the Plain of Esdraelon. The 5th Cavalry Division was to travel by the northern and more difficult track, from Sindiane to Abu Shusheh 18 miles (29 km) south-east of Haifa and on to attack Nazareth. Meanwhile, the 4th Cavalry Division was to take the southern pass to Lejjun via the Musmus Pass and on to capture Afula. In reserve, the Australian Mounted Division was to follow the 4th Cavalry Division via the Musmus Pass to Lejjun.

If they could quickly capture the Esdraelon Plain while the two Ottoman armies were fighting in the Judean Hills against the XXI Corps infantry in the Battle of Sharon, and the XX Corps infantry in the Battle of Nablus, the railways could be cut, the roads controlled, and the lines of retreat across the plain for these two Ottoman armies west of the Jordan would be virtually cut. Success depended on the rapid capture of the communications hub at Afula and the Yildirim Army Group's general headquarters at Nazareth which would disrupt communication and simultaneously almost surround the Eighth Army and cut the communications and supply lines to both the Seventh and Eighth Armies in the Judean Hills. (See Falls Map 21 below which shows these cavalry advances.) Success required that the cavalry not only capture but hold Afula, Nazareth, and the Esdraelon Plain for some time. The men and horses of three cavalry divisions would be dependent on rations being quickly and efficiently transported forward many miles from their base.

The 5th Cavalry Division's objectives were to capture Nazareth, Liman von Sanders, and the Yildirim Army Group's headquarters 70 miles (110 km) from Asurf, before clearing the plain to Afula. The 4th Cavalry Division's objectives were to capture the town of Afula and then advance eastwards across the Esdraelon Plain to capture Beisan and occupy the railway and/or road bridges over the Jordan River. In particular, they were to hold or destroy the Jisr Mejami bridge, 12 miles (19 km) north of Beisan, a distance of 97 miles (156 km) from their starting point. The Australian Mounted Division, in reserve, was to enter the Esdraelon Plain and occupy Lejjun while the 3rd Light Horse Brigade advanced to capture Jenin, 68 miles (109 km) from their starting point.

== Prelude ==
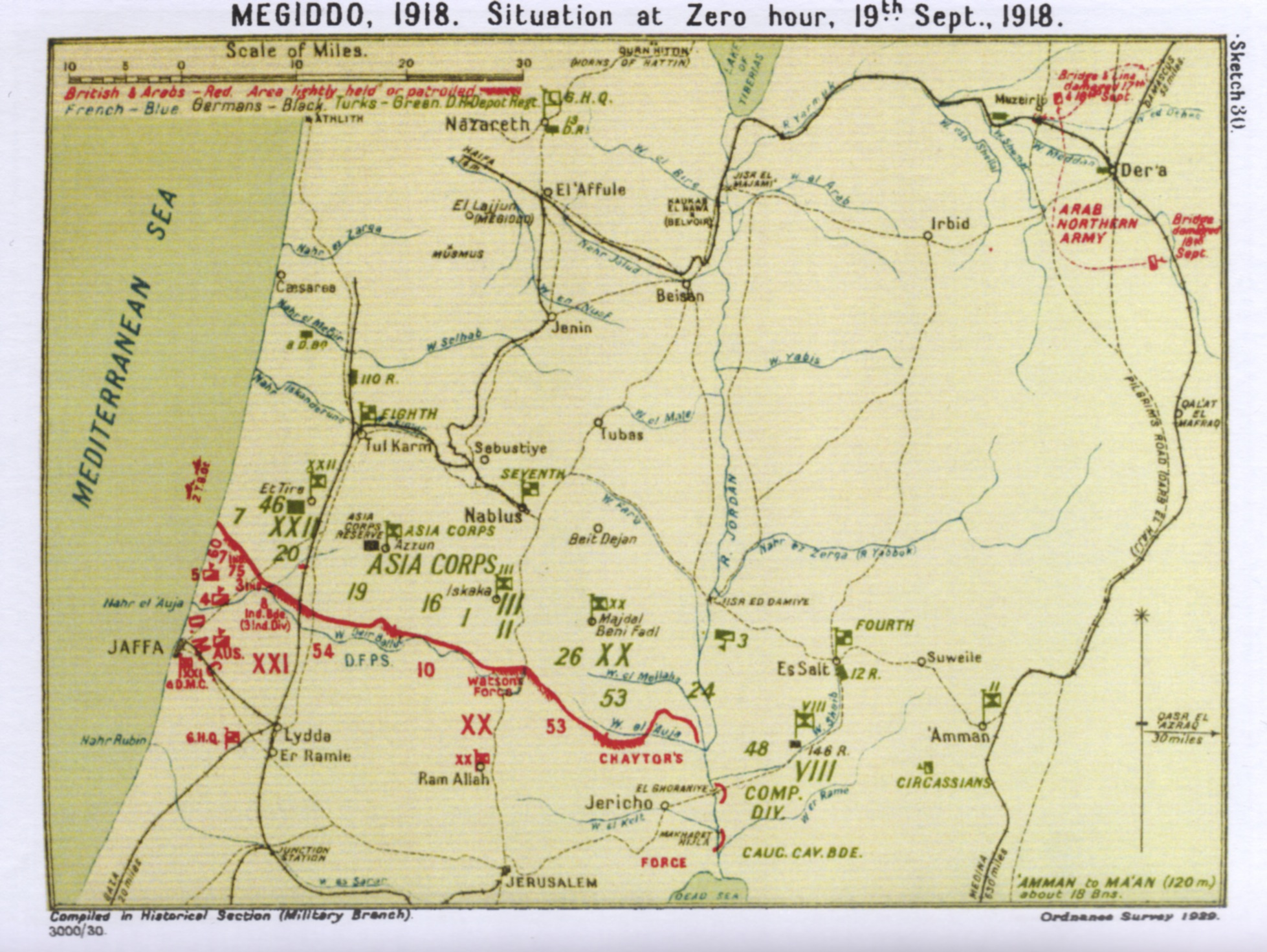
Falls Sketch Map 30: Situation at zero hour, 19 September

According to David Woodward, "concentration, surprise, and speed were key elements in the blitzkrieg warfare planned by Allenby." (Note: The issue of whether or not it was Allenby's plan has been raised in the literature. [Erickson 2007 pp. 141–2] According to Chauvel, Allenby had already decided on his plan before the Second Transjordan attack in April/May which had confirmed the Ottoman determination to defend the Deraa railway junction and the difficulties for mounted operations in the area. [Hill 1978 p. 161]) Victory at Megiddo depended on controlling the skies by destroying or dominating German aircraft activities and reconnaissances, through constant bombing raids by the Royal Air Force (RAF) and Australian Flying Corps (AFC), on Afula to disrupt communications between the Yildirim Army Headquarters at Nazareth and the Seventh and Eighth Armies' headquarters at Tulkarm and Nablus. Victory also depended on artillery barrages of sufficient intensity and effectiveness, to enable the infantry to quickly outflank the Ottoman defenders on the coast, and drive a gap in the Ottoman front line, for the Desert Mounted Corps to ride through on their way to the Esdraelon Plain, on the first day of battle.

=== 4th Cavalry Division breakthrough ===
With the 11th Light Armoured Motor Battery and 1st Light Car Patrol attached, the 4th Cavalry Division watered at the 'Auja River before moving to the south-east of Jlil, close behind the infantry and the front line. From here, a divisional pioneer party reached the front line at 07:00 on 19 September to cut a gap and flag a path through the Ottoman wire. By 08:40 permission was given by the 7th (Meerut) Division, which had attacked the western sector of the Tabsor defences, for the 4th Cavalry Division, accompanied by three horse artillery batteries which had rejoined the division after taking part in the bombardment and creeping barrage at the beginning of the Battle of Sharon, to pass through the gap in the Ottoman front line defences created by their attacks. (See Falls Map 20) The vanguard 11th Cavalry Brigade was led by the 36th Jacob's Horse as advance guard.

Falls Map 20 detail. Breakthrough

The 4th Cavalry Division advance began at 09:00, riding through the Ramadan and Zerkiyeh marches, and northwards towards Liktera and the southern end of the Musmus Pass 25 miles (40 km) away. By 10:00 the 11th and 12th Cavalry Brigades had crossed Nahr el Faliq and were moving along both sides of the Tabsor to El Mugheir road, followed by the 10th Cavalry Brigade.

By 11:15 the division had passed the Zerqiye crossing, and after an hour's halt on the Burj el 'Atot to El Mugheir line, they moved in three brigade columns in echelon formation. The 12th Cavalry Brigade proceeded straight on to Jelameh, while the 10th and 11th Cavalry Brigades crossed the edge of the Iskanderune marches at Shellalif. By 13:00 the division was approaching El Mugheir before crossing the Iskanderune River, where they rested before advancing to Liktera. (Note: Massey claims they arrived at Liktera at 22:00, but it could not have been that late, as the Liktera engagement occurred during daylight. [Massey 1920 pp. 152–3] [See Falls Map 21])

=== Capture of Liktera ===
An entrenched Ottoman line of defence garrisoned by the Eighth Army Depot Regiment, stretched through Jelameh, El Mejdel, and Liktera to the sea near the mouth of Nahr el Mefjir. (Note: This defensive line has also been located to the south, from Qaqun to the mouth of the Nahr Iskanderun. [Falls 1930 Vol. 2 p. 514])

Although the 4th Cavalry Division had started later, riding north on the left and to the rear of 5th Cavalry Division in echelon, both divisions approached Liktera on the Nahr el Mefjir. Faced with the "whole plain alive with cavalry twelve miles behind the Turkish line", Liktera was quickly captured, along with 50 prisoners. The remainder of the Liktera garrison retreated towards Qaqun, closely followed by the Jacob's Horse (11th Cavalry Brigade, 4th Cavalry Division), which took 126 prisoners. This regiment went forward to Tell edh Dhrur, where another 80 prisoners were captured.

=== Musmus Pass ===
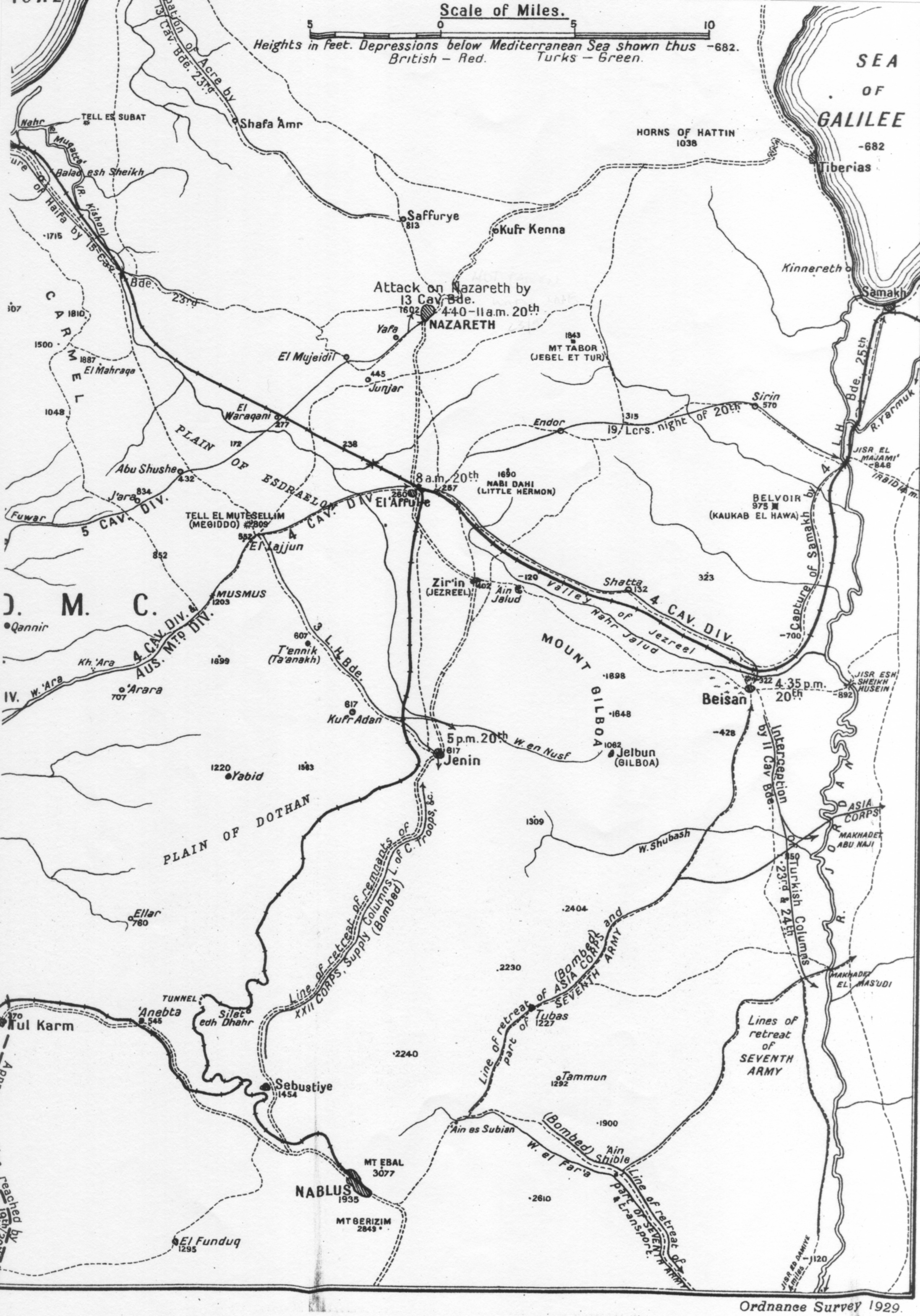
Falls Map 21: Cavalry advances 19 to 25 September 1918. Detail shows 5th Cavalry Division advance to Nazareth, 4th Cavalry Division advance to Afula and Beisan, Australian Mounted Division advance to Lajjun, 3rd Light Horse Brigade advance to Jenin, 19th Lancers advance to Jisr el Mejamie, and 4th Light Horse Brigade advance to Samakh. Also shown are the three main lines of retreat bombed by aircraft and the retreat of the Seventh Ottoman Army and Asia Corps across the Jordan River.

At 18:30 on 19 September, the 4th Cavalry Division halted for three hours to water, feed, and rest. The 11th Cavalry Brigade concentrated and watered at Tell edh Dhrur; the 12th Cavalry Brigade reached Jelameh on the railway north of Qaqun and also watered, while the 10th Cavalry Brigade rode on to Kerkur at the entrance to the Musmus Pass, 3.5 miles (5.6 km) north of Tell edh Dhrur. After watering, the 2nd Lancers (Gardner's Horse) (10th Cavalry Brigade) pushed forward with the 11th Light Armoured Motor Battery to occupy Kh. 'Ara, 5 miles (8.0 km) north-east of Kerkur and about one-third of the way through the Musmus Pass, at 23:00.

The 14 miles (23 km) long Musmus Pass across the Mount Carmel Range had been in use since before the 15th century BC when the army of the Egyptian Pharaoh Thothmes III travelled through it, and during the 1st century AD by the Roman Emperor Vespasian and his army. The pass rises to 1,200 feet (370 m) above sea level, as it follows the Wadi Ara up the southern side of the Samarian Hills, at the time only about 300 yards (270 m) wide. Beyond Kh. 'Ara and 'Arara (not to be confused with Arara in the Judean Hills, which was captured during the Battle of Arara on 19 September 1918), both high up on either side of the Musmus Pass, the pass narrows for several miles as it approaches Musmus on the watershed. From here the route becomes very narrow, descending to a steep ridge and a rough section before reaching Lejjun at the mouth of the pass on the Esdraelon Plain with the whole of the Esdraelon Plain stretching out 300–400 feet (91–122 m) below.

Major General George Barrow, commanding the 4th Cavalry Division, ordered the 10th Cavalry Brigade to march on Lejjun by 23:00 "at the latest", whether or not watering was finished. He then motored forward to the 2nd Lancers, the advance guard, and at 11:45 ordered them "to push right through the pass to El Lejjun" to avoid being held up beyond Kh. 'Ara. They arrived at Lejjun at 03:30 on 20 September without meeting any opposition. Here they captured about 100 Ottoman soldiers, possibly the advance guard of the Ottoman battalion Liman von Sanders had ordered to occupy the pass.

Meanwhile, Barrow returned along the Musmus Pass to meet the 10th Cavalry Brigade, which had missed the entrance to the pass and gone 5 miles (8.0 km) north on a wrong road, followed by the 11th Cavalry Brigade. Barrow, now on horseback, rode back to the 12th Cavalry Brigade, commanded by Brigadier General Wigan, which was to have been the rearguard, and ordered it forward to support the 2nd Lancers, which regiment came under Wigan's orders. At 01:10 on 20 September, more than two hours after the 10th Cavalry Brigade should have started into the Musmus Pass, the 12th Cavalry Brigade's advance guard, the 6th King Edward's Own Cavalry, moved out from Kerkuk. They trotted for 20 minutes, walked for 20 minutes, and halted for five minutes to arrive at Lejjun at 04:05, with the rest of the 12th Cavalry Brigade arriving, without incident, soon after. They moved by half-sections of horse through the pass, without sending out flank guards to piquet "the heights." As they negotiated the pass, they overtook and stopped a long column of Ottoman transport, capturing about 200 prisoners. Barrow later commented that a "couple of machine guns would have sufficed to hold us up for hours."

Although the entrance to the pass had been secured by a regiment, the remainder of the 10th Cavalry Brigade did not reinforce the regiment. The brigade commander, Brigadier General Richard Howard-Vyse had disobeyed divisional orders to do so and when the brigade finally advanced, twice got lost. In consequence, Barrow, the commander of the 4th Cavalry Division, relieved Howard-Vyse of his command on the spot. Lieutenant Colonel W. G. K. Green of the Jacob's Horse took command of the brigade. (Note: Knowing the Musmus Pass represented the most critical phase of his Corps' operations, Chauvel had driven up in the dawn of 20 September and saw Howard-Vyse riding back. Allenby had insisted on this untried officer being given command of the 10th Cavalry Brigade, replacing the experienced Brigadier General Godwin, who was then serving as Brigadier General General Staff, Desert Mounted Corps. [Hill 1978 p. 168] [Falls 1930 Vol. 2 p. 667])

== Battle ==
=== Lancers charge Musmus defenders ===
After arriving at Lejjun at 03:30, the 2nd Lancers watered, fed, and breakfasted before setting out at 05:30 for Afula on a "three-squadrons front followed by the 11th Light Armoured Car Battery and a subsection of the 17th Machine-Gun Squadron." Ten minutes later, the centre squadron was fired on by six companies of the 13th Depot Regiment and military police, supported by 12 machine guns, which Liman von Sanders had ordered to occupy the Musmus Pass at Lejjun at 12:30 on 19 September. They had had to march from Nazareth to Lejjun, a distance of 15 miles (24 km). (Note: Their failure to get into position was incomprehensible to the official British historian. [Falls 1930 Vol. 2 p. 520])

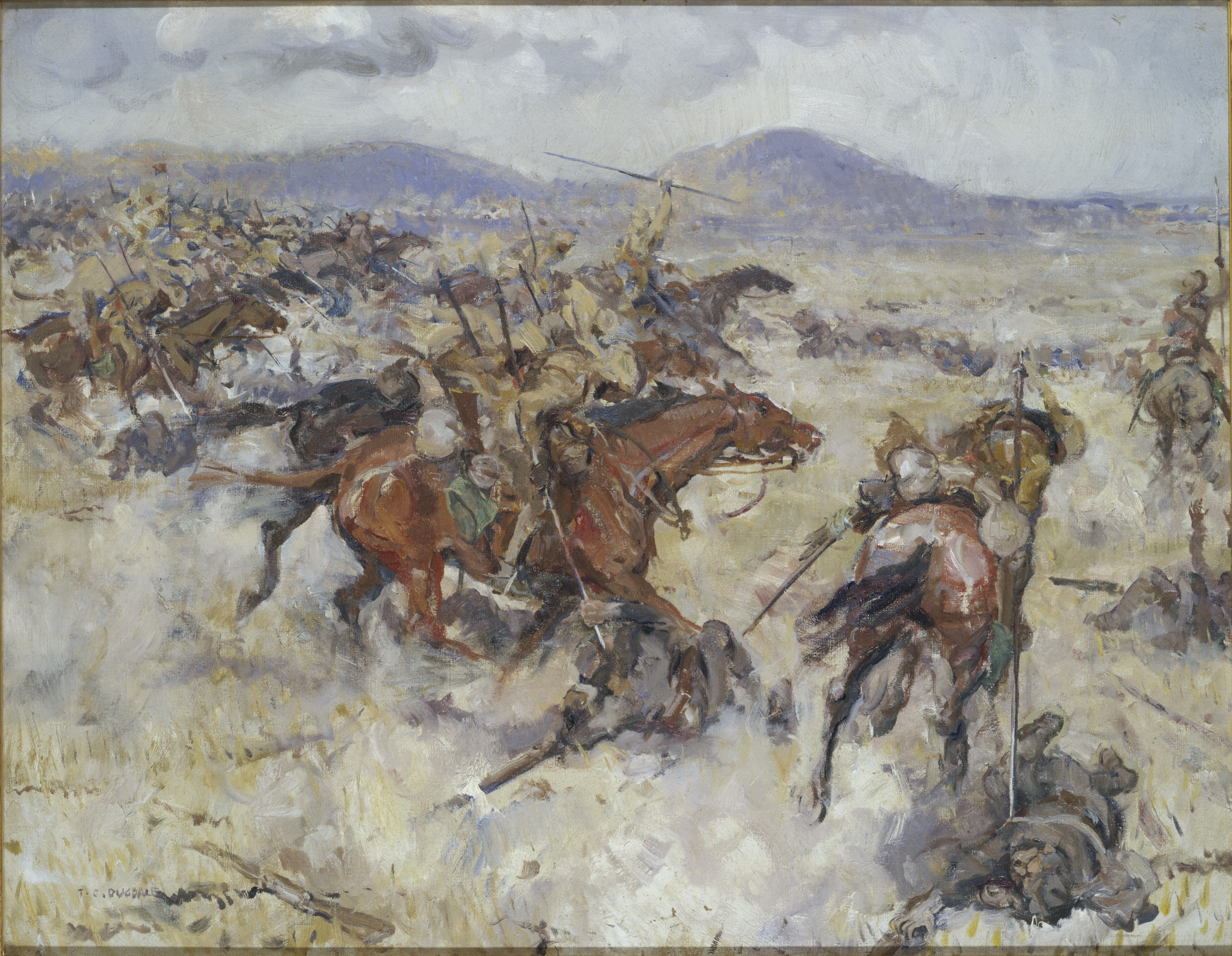
Charge of the 2nd Lancers at El Afuli

Having failed to reach Lejjun, Liman von Sanders' force had taken up a position across the Lejjun to Afula road in the Esdraelon Plain. One squadron of the 2nd Lancers, supported by machine guns and armoured cars, attacked frontally, while the reserve squadron moved to the right along a slight depression to charge from the flank. A second line of Ottoman defences was encountered by the third squadron on the right; the two squadrons eventually cooperating in a simultaneous charge which "was driven home." The lancers speared 46 and captured 470 prisoners, suffering one man wounded and 12 horses killed.

British Empire reconnaissance aircraft reported three British armoured cars halfway across the Esdraelon Plain, on their way to Afula. One cavalry brigade was seen at Lejjun, while two were just entering the plain, advancing on a broad front.

... bullets were coming unpleasantly close ... [as I] edged towards the right with the intention of locating the enemy's left flank ... Just then the squadron ran into a wire fence hidden in the jowar [millet] which covered that part of the plain. I went on ahead and left it to my second in command (Ressaidar Jang Bahadur Sing) to reform the squadron ... Bullets were coming thick and fast now, and I imagined that the squadron had had pretty heavy casualties; added to this I was in a blue funk of striking an uncrossable nullah ... the map showing a tributary of the Kishon between me and the enemy ... I galloped back to lead the squadron off more to the right. There seemed to be plenty of the men left, and the formation was still tolerably good. We were moving at a good 15 miles (24 km) an hour by now ... but I was still in mortal terror that the Turks' determined stand might be fortified by the knowledge that a deep nullah lay between themselves and us ... However, I need not have worried, for we were in for it now ... Before I realized it we were right on top of the enemy, and it was only when I saw a young Turk deliberately aiming at me that I realized that I was still holding my map in my right hand, and had forgotten to draw my sword.

— Captain D.E. Whitworth commanding 'B' Squadron 2nd Lancers

=== Afula ===
The 2nd Lancers continued their advance to Afula forty minutes after their successful charge, and were fired on at 07:45 on 20 September, when they were 0.5 miles (0.80 km) from the town. By the time they circled around to gallop in from the north, two regiments of the 14th Cavalry Brigade (5th Cavalry Division), the 29th Lancers (Deccan Horse) and the 34th Prince Albert Victor's Own Poona Horse, had captured the railway station and the road to Nazareth, respectively.

The 5th Cavalry Division's leading 'D' Squadron, 34th Poona Horse (14th Cavalry Brigade), had skirted the town of Birket El Fuleh to ride directly towards Afula. At 06:30 they encountered seven lorries carrying German and Ottoman soldiers on the Afula road, about 3 miles (4.8 km) south of the town. Led by a German officer, the enemy soldiers quickly jumped out of the lorries and opened machine gun fire, killing a British Indian Army cavalry trooper and wounding a non-commissioned officer. 'D' squadron returned fire with Hotchkiss guns. Shortly afterwards, they were reinforced by the remainder of the 14th Cavalry Brigade; the brigade's machine gun squadron winning the engagement.

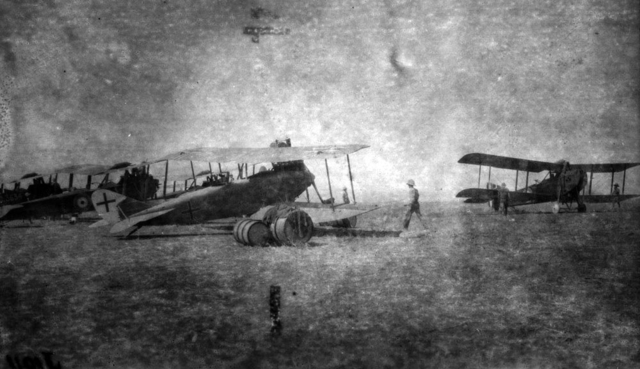
Four captured German DFW CB biplanes and British Armstrong Whitworth FK8 Serial 3634 in background at Afula aerodrome

At about 08:00, the 4th Cavalry Division's 2nd Lancers (10th Cavalry Brigade) and the 5th Cavalry Division's 29th Lancers (Deccan Horse) (14th Cavalry Brigade) entered Afula. Here about 75 German and 200 Ottoman prisoners were captured at the railway station, along with ten locomotives and 50 railway trucks or wagons in the sidings. A hospital, an aerodrome with three undamaged aircraft, a large quantity of petrol, and large stocks of champagne and hock were also captured. Armoured cars continued the pursuit, capturing 12 German lorries on the road to Beisan, while the railway running south and east from Afula was cut; the line to the west had already been cut by the 13th Cavalry Brigade (5th Cavalry Division).

On the morning after the charge outside Afule [21 September], having settled down to a Boche cigar and a bottle of ditto hock, I would not have changed places with President Wilson himself!

— 2nd Lancers' officer

=== Capture of Beisan ===
The 5th Cavalry Division remained to garrison Afula, where they were rejoined later that day by the 15th Imperial Service Cavalry Brigade and their divisional artillery, which had been left the night before to move through the Abu Shusheh pass during daylight.

Barrow ordered the 4th Cavalry Division, less the 19th Lancers (Fane's Horse), 12th Cavalry Brigade, to advance to Beisan; leaving Afula at 13:00 on 20 September, led by the 10th Cavalry Brigade. They advanced quickly along the main road protected by flank guards; the 36th Jacob's Horse, 11th Cavalry Brigade, capturing some German soldiers along the way. About 100 enemy soldiers retreating from the direction of Mount Ephraim were captured during this advance, and while moving down the railway through Shatta into Beisan another 100 or more soldiers with three 150-mm howitzers facing eastwards were captured. A line of piquets was established from Afula to Beisan and another 700 prisoners were captured during the night.

Beisan was captured without a fight between 16:30 and 18:00 on 20 September. Here the 4th Cavalry Division rested, having covered 70 miles (110 km), the first 20 miles (32 km) over sandy soil, and fought two actions all in 34 hours with the loss of only 26 horses. This was the first opportunity for the division to take saddles off the horses since the cavalry advance began.

At Beisan, the 4th Cavalry Division was well in advance of their rations transport, which did not catch up until the next day, when lorries delivered rations. Until then, the division had the remains of their two days' special emergency ration, which had been carried in sandbags on their saddles. Ration transport had been 50 miles (80 km) behind the division; 'A', 'B' Echelons, the Divisional Transport Train, and Ammunition Column bivouacking for the night at Shellalif on 19 September. The special camel convoy had been unable to keep up, and its provisions were distributed elsewhere. By the evening of 20 September rations had also been delivered to the 5th Cavalry Division at Aujah by motor lorry via the Musmus Pass, while 'A' Echelon and the Divisional Transport Train were bivouacked at Qaqun.

The 10th Cavalry Brigade had had only two full night's rest since leaving the Jordan Valley on 11 September, nine nights before and about 150 miles (240 km) away. "They had had no rest during the last three nights." The brigade had participated in long advances as part of divisional formations, during which such things as watering and off-saddling were complicated by the large numbers involved. Despite this, the brigade only lost 15 horses; 36th Jacob's Horse lost four, and the 19th Lancers, one.

By the evening of 20 September, Chauvel's communications with his cavalry divisions, were limited to wireless and aircraft. The last aerial reconnaissance on 20 September reported three large fires burning at Nablus railway station, fires burning at the Balata dumps, and the whole Ottoman front line from El Lubban to the Jordan alarmed. They also reported a brigade of British cavalry entering Beisan.

=== Capture of the Jisr el Mejamie bridge ===
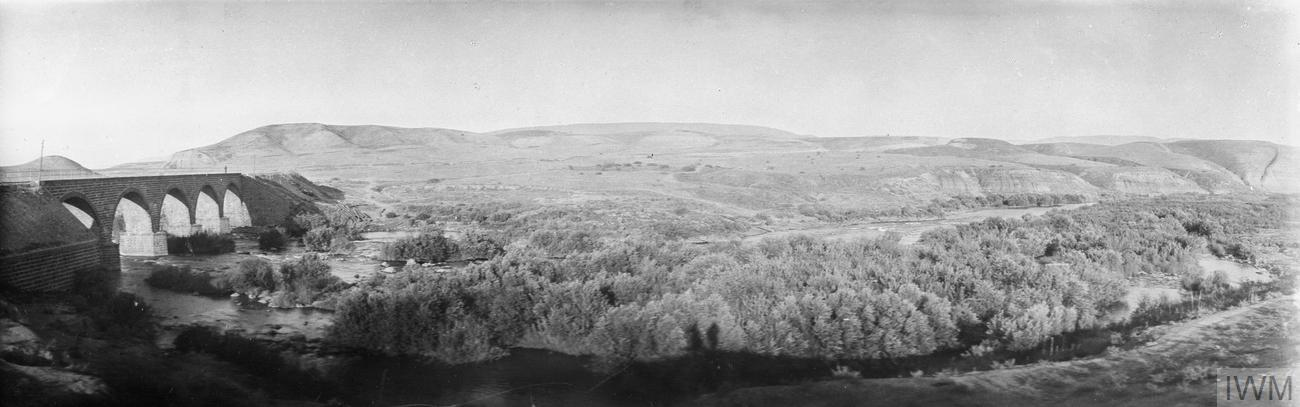
Jisr Mejami railway bridge over Jordan River

The 19th Lancers (12th Cavalry Brigade, 4th Cavalry Division) remained at Afula, with orders to ride during the evening directly to Jidr el Mejamie (Mejamie Bridge), 9 miles (14 km) north-north-east of Beisan, to capture the railway bridges and prepare them for demolition.

Accompanied by a section of the 18th Machine Gun Company and a party of the 4th Field Squadron Royal Engineers, the regiment left Afula at 19:30 after handing over to the 5th Cavalry Division. They rode 20 miles (32 km) during the night over very rough stony country to reach Jisr el Mejamie at 05:00 on 21 September. The rail tracks on the left bank of the Jordan River and on the right bank of the Yarmuk River were picked up, thus blocking the connection between the Hedjaz Railway and the Palestine Railway systems. Explosive charges were attached to the bridge over the Jordan River and over the Yarmuk River to the north, but were not exploded. The second bridge was not captured, but it was later blown up by retreating Yildirim forces.

== Aftermath ==
Allenby described the successful advance:

... my infantry ... have driven the enemy into the arms of the Desert Mounted Corps operating from Beisan and Jenin. Cavalry have occupied Nazareth. I cannot estimate total number of prisoners, but 18,000 have been counted. I motored to Lejjun, today; 65 miles N. of here, overlooking the plain of Esdraelon. A beautiful view across the flat vale. Nazareth, high in hills, to the N.; Mount Tabor opposite; Mount Gilboa to the E., overlooking Jezreel. Some of the Indian cavalry got into Turks with the lance, in the plain yesterday, and killed many. I ... passed through thousands of prisoners today ...

— Allenby letters to King Hussein of the Hedjaz and Lady Allenby 21 September 1918

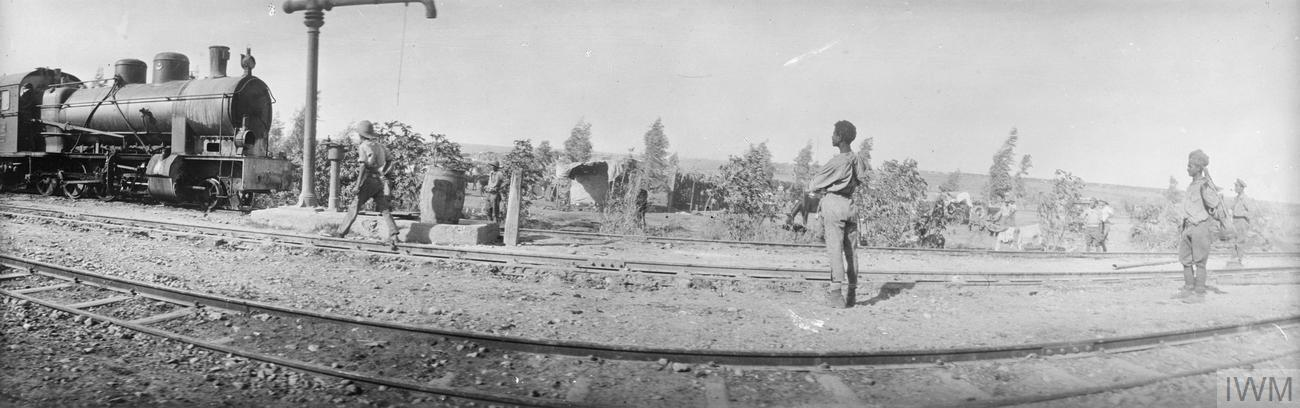
The first British train (captured engine and carriages) arrived at Beisan on 25 September

During the first 36 hours of battle, from 04:30 on 19 September until 17:00 on 20 September, the German and Ottoman front line had been cut by infantry, and the cavalry had passed through the gap to reach their objectives at Afula, Nazareth, and Beisan. The continuing British Empire infantry attack in the Judean Hills had forced the Ottoman Seventh and Eighth Armies to withdraw northwards towards the waiting Desert Mounted Corps.

By dusk on 19 September, 4,000 prisoners had been captured and brigade transport following the cavalry divisions was 20 miles (32 km) behind enemy lines in what had been Ottoman Empire territory.

On 22 September the 4th Cavalry Division's motor ambulances, which had been working in the Judean Hills transporting wounded infantry, rejoined their division at Beisan.

=== Liman von Sanders' withdrawal ===
Liman von Sanders had no combat formations available to stop the cavalry advance up the coast and across the Esdraelon Plain; Allenby's attack forced the Yildirim Army Group and its commander to retire. Liman von Sanders' retreat from Nazareth, began in the early hours of 20 September, taking him to Tiberias and Samakh late in the afternoon, and then on to Deraa, where he arrived on the morning of 21 September on his way to Damascus.

=== Retreat of the Asia Corps ===
With about 700 German and 1,300 Ottoman soldiers of the 16th and 19th Divisions, von Oppen was moving northwards from Tubas towards Beisan when he learned it had already been captured. He decided to advance during the night of 22 September to Samakh, where he correctly guessed Liman von Sanders would order a strong rearguard action. However, Jevad, the commander of the Eighth Army, ordered him to cross the Jordan instead; he successfully got all the Germans and some of the Ottoman soldiers across during 23 September, before the 11th Cavalry Brigade attack, which closed the last Jordan River gap. Those who had not crossed were captured. (Note: Liman von Sanders was very critical of Jevad's intervention, which considerably weakened the Samakh position, but von Oppen would have had to break through the 4th Cavalry Division's line of piquets to get there. [Falls 1930 Vol. 2 p. 546])

=== Jordan River gap closed ===
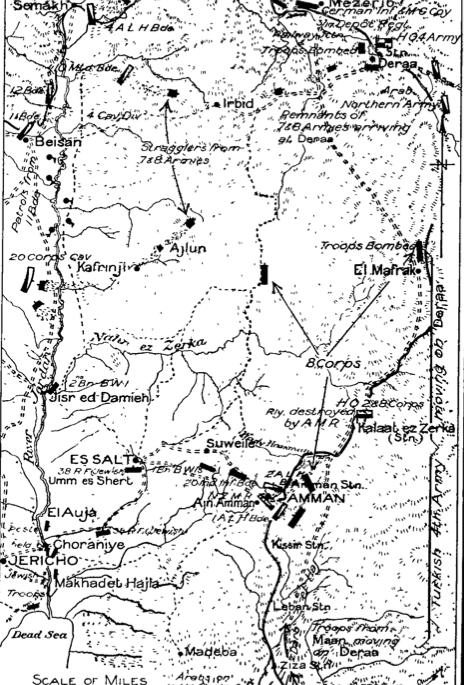
Gullett's Map 43 shows the area from Ziza and Jericho to Semakh and Deraa, with positions of the 4th Light Horse Brigade at Samakh, the 4th Cavalry Division and retiring Ottoman forces, the Ottoman Fourth Army headquarters at Deraa, and Chaytor's Force at Amman on 25 September

The Jisr ed Damieh bridge, which carried the Wadi Fara road from Nablus across the Jordan River, was captured on 22 September by Meldrum's Force, comprising the New Zealand Mounted Rifles Brigade and 1st and 2nd Battalions, British West Indies Regiment, supported by artillery. All fords south of this bridge were also denied to the enemy.

Between 21 and 23 September the Ottoman III Corps (Ottoman Seventh Army) fought a rearguard action from Tubas to the Jordan River, which delayed the British cavalry encirclement and enable what remained of the Ottoman Eighth Army and the Ottoman Seventh Army to retreat to the eastern side of the Jordan River.

Late in the evening of 22 September, Chauvel ordered Barrow's 4th Cavalry Division to advance south from Beisan along the Jordan River to close a 20 miles (32 km) gap north from the Jisr ed Damieh bridge, which Chaytor's Force had captured.

==== 23 September ====
During the day, strong patrols by the 4th Cavalry Division had moved southwards down the Beisan to Nablus road, on the west bank of the Jordan, and down the Merka to Jisr ed Damieh road, on the east bank.

The 11th Cavalry Brigade advance southwards; the 36th Jacob's Horse on the east bank was fired on, 4.5 miles (7.2 km) south of Beisan to the south-east of Khirbet es Samriye. A long column of retiring Ottoman soldiers was attempting to cross the Jordan River at Makhadet Abu Naji under cover of a 1,000-strong rearguard with 30 machine guns. (Note: Falls Sketch Map 21 (above) shows Asia Corps crossing the Jordan at Makhadet abu Naji.) As the 29th Lancers, advanced down on the west bank, they were fired on from the rearguard at Makhadat abu Naji which was attacked in the rear and the flank by the 36th Jacob's Horse; they broke the rearguard into a "hopeless rout". The commander of the 16th Division, Rushdi Bey, and 18 machine guns were captured, along with 800 prisoners, which were later identified to have been the rearguard of von Oppen's Asia Corps.

Meanwhile, another stronger rearguard on the east bank protecting the retreating columns was attacked by the 1/1st County of London (Middlesex) Yeomanry, 11th Cavalry Brigade 4th Cavalry Division. Further attacks by the 36th Jacob's Horse were repulsed by a second much larger body of Ottoman soldiers moving towards the Jordan River 1 mile (1.6 km) to the south. The support of the Hampshire Battery RHA and the cooperation of the 36th Jacob's Horse from the east bank was requested in a third attack.

At 11:00 the Hampshire Battery RHA came into action, but they drew accurate fire from two batteries of field guns south-east of the ford, which hit all their guns. About 5,000 yards (4,600 m) south, a squadron of 1/1st County of London (Middlesex) Yeomanry found a ford across the Jordan River. They quickly deployed and put the enemy guns "out of action." The 1/1st County of London (Middlesex) Yeomanry began their attack from both sides of the river and eventually captured the ford, along with 4,000 prisoners, leaving many dead. At 15:00 the defenders withdrew from the Makhadat Abu Naji ford, "suffering very heavily indeed from machine-gun and automatic-rifle fire, and abandoning an enormous amount of material."

==== 24–25 September ====
Falls Sketch Map 36: Action at Makhadet el Mas'udi on 24 September 1918

Units of the 4th Cavalry Division continued the advance southwards from Beisan on 24 September, after rations had been distributed. At 10:35 an observation post sighted a column of Ottoman soldiers making for a ford across the Jordan River at Makhadet el Mas'udi, where the Ottoman advanced guard arrived and deployed its machine guns to cover the escape of a larger body of Ottoman troops across another ford 1 mile (1.6 km) further south. (Note: Falls Sketch Map 21 (above) indicates the Seventh Army crossing the Jordan at Makhadet el Mas'udi.) (See Falls Sketch Map 36 Detail 'A' Situation at 11:00) The 1/1st County of London (Middlesex) Yeomanry attack at Makhadet el Mas'udi ford succeeded at 12:30, while the 29th Lancers reinforced the Yeomanry attack on the main column, capturing a total of 5,000 prisoners, including an Ottoman divisional commander, with many dead.

Troops captured by the 11th Cavalry Brigade on 24 September were the rear of the Seventh Ottoman Army, the majority of which had crossed during the previous night and early morning, continuing their retreat towards Irbid, while von Oppen's Asia Corps and the Fourth Ottoman Army were retreating towards Deraa.

The 11th Cavalry Brigade continued their advance 6 miles (9.7 km) south to Ras Umm Zoka without encountering any further Ottoman columns, while the XX Corps Cavalry Regiment, which made contact with the 29th Lancers, reached 'Ain Male 7 miles (11 km) east of Tubas, capturing several thousand prisoners. The 11th Cavalry Brigade subsequently returned to Beisan on 25 September.
