= Battle of Sharon =

First World War battle (September 1918)

- Part of the Middle Eastern theatre of World War I
- Falls Map 20 Detail shows capture of Nahr el Faliq and clearing of the coastal plain for the cavalry advance, the attack on the Tabsor defences and the advances towards Tulkarm and Et Tire
Date	19–25 September 1918
Location	Series of infantry attacks along the front line: from the Mediterranean coast to the Rafat salient in the Judean Hills; infantry captures of Tulkarm and Tabsor with subsequent cavalry occupation of the Esdraelon Plain; cavalry attacks northwards to Haifa, Nazareth and Samakh
Result	Allied victory

Belligerents
British Empire: United Kingdom; India; Australia; New Zealand; France (Arab Revolt) Hejaz	Ottoman Empire; German Empire

Commanders and leaders
(United Kingdom of Great Britain and Ireland) Edmund Allenby (British Empire) Edward Bulfin (Australia) Harry Chauvel	(German Empire) Otto Liman von Sanders (Ottoman Empire) Mustafa Kemal Pasha (Ottoman Empire) Jevad Pasha

Units involved
Egyptian Expeditionary Force: XXI Corps; 3rd (Lahore), 7th (Meerut), 54th, 60th and 75th Divisions, the Détachement Français de Palestine et de Syrie; Desert Mounted Corps; 4th and 5th Cavalry and Australian Mounted Divisions including the 1er Régiment Mixte de Marche de Cavalerie du Levant	Yildirim Army Group: Seventh Army; III Corps: 1st and 11th Divisions; XX Corps: 24th, 26th, and 53rd Divisions; Eighth Army; XXII Corps: 7th and 20th Divisions; Asia Corps: 16th and 19th Divisions, German Pasha II Brigade; Army Troops: 46th Division

Strength
35,000 infantry, 9,000 cavalry, 383 guns	40,598 infantry

Casualties and losses
XXI Corps 3,378 casualties including 446 killed Desert Mounted Corps 125 killed, 408 wounded or missing	More than 3,000 dead and wounded, unknown casualties from aerial bombing, more than 25,000 prisoners

The Battle of Sharon fought between 19 and 25 September 1918, began the set piece Battle of Megiddo half a day before the Battle of Nablus, in which large formations engaged and responded to movements by the opposition, according to pre-existing plans, in the last months of the Sinai and Palestine Campaign of World War I. The fighting took place over a wide area from the Mediterranean Sea east to the Rafat salient in the Judean Hills. Here the Egyptian Expeditionary Force (EEF) XXI Corps with the French brigade sized Détachement Français de Palestine et de Syrie attacked the Yildirim Army Group Eighth Army's XXII Corps and German Asia Corps. The Battle of Sharon extended well behind the Ottoman front lines when the Desert Mounted Corps rode through a gap in the front line across the Plain of Sharon to occupy the Esdraelon Plain. Meanwhile, during the Battle of Nablus the XX Corps attacked Nablus while Chaytor's Force held the right flank in the Jordan Valley before advancing to secure bridges and fords across the Jordan River, to continue the encirclement the defenders in the Judean Hills. Subsequently, Chaytor's Force advanced against the Fourth Army to capture Es Salt and Amman after the Second Battle of Amman.

The Battle of Sharon began on 19 September with a Western Front style bombardment during which two-thirds of the mainly ground-based heavy artillery, supported by the firepower of two destroyers pounded Ottoman positions, while one third of the heavy artillery fired creeping barrages to cover the infantry assaults. The XXI Corps infantry attacked simultaneously along the front line from the Mediterranean coast where the 60th Division, launched an attack on the western coastal section of the front line defended by the Eighth Army's XXII Corps. During this Battle of Tulkarm the 60th Division breached the front and second line trenches to eventually capture Tulkarm, the site of the Eighth Army headquarters. On their right, the main Tabsor system of trenches held by the Ottoman XXII Corps was attacked and eventually captured during the Battle of Tabsor, by the 3rd (Lahore), 7th (Meerut), and the 75th Divisions. These three divisions subsequently advanced, despite the Ottoman XXII Corps being reinforced, to capture Et Tire and Masudiye Station. In the process of the battles for Tulkarm and Tabsor the 7th (Meerut) and 60th Divisions created a gap in the front line, for the Desert Mounted Corps to ride through. They rode north and eastwards to the rear to capture the defending Ottoman armies' lines of communication. The right flank of the attacking XXI Corps was protected from the Eighth Army's Asia Corps, by the 54th (East Anglian) Division and the French Colonial Détachement Français de Palestine et de Syrie holding and pivoting on the Rafat salient, during the Battle of Arara as the infantry battle progressed.

The cavalry phase of the Battle of Sharon began as soon as the gap was made during the infantry attacks. The 5th Cavalry Division led the way north up along the Plain of Sharon followed by the 4th Cavalry Division with the Australian Mounted Division in reserve. These divisions subsequently rode across the Mount Carmel Range through two passes, to occupy the Esdraelon Plain, on 20 September. Here they cut the main Ottoman lines of communication. Units of the 4th and 5th Cavalry Divisions converged to capture Afulah with the 4th Cavalry Division capturing Beisan in the afternoon. The Australian Mounted Division captured Jenin along with thousands of prisoners when they captured the main line of retreat from Nablus to Damascus. On 20 September Nazareth, the site of the Ottoman Army's Yildirim Army Group headquarters, was unsuccessfully attacked by the 5th Cavalry Division. During the Battle of Nazareth the Ottoman Commander in Chief, Otto Liman von Sanders, was forced to escape. The 5th Cavalry Division captured the town the following day and several days later this division also captured Haifa and Acre following the Battle of Haifa. On the last day of the Battle of Sharon, the Australian Mounted Division attacked a German reinforced rearguard garrison at Samakh, which had been put on the alert by Liman von Sanders during his escape from Nazareth. The Australian Light Horse victory at the Battle of Samakh and the subsequent Capture of Tiberias ended the Battle of Sharon and the Battle of Megiddo. As a result of the battles of Sharon and Nablus, known collectively as the Battle of Megiddo, much territory and many prisoners were captured. The Final Offensive of the Sinai and Palestine Campaign began the day after the Battle of Megiddo ended, with the pursuit to Damascus, which was captured on 1 October.

== Background ==
After the series of Central Powers defeats in Palestine at the end of 1917, at Beersheba, at Gaza, at Mughar Ridge, and with the loss of large areas of southern Palestine during the subsequent retreats of the Seventh and Eighth Armies back into the Judean Hills, and following the loss of Jerusalem, several of the German and Ottoman army commanders in the region were replaced. General Erich von Falkenhayn commanding the Yildirim Army Group was replaced by General Otto Liman von Sanders and Friedrich Freiherr Kress von Kressenstein, commander of the Eighth Army was replaced by Djevad Pasha. Cemal Pasha appointed Cemal Kucjuk Pasha to command the Fourth Army. The commander of the Seventh Army, Mustafa Kemal who had previously resigned his command, was reinstated early in September 1918.

The focus of the Ottoman Army's war effort in 1918 turned from Palestine to Anatolia, to the provinces and territories lost by their empire between 1877 and 1878 during the Russo-Turkish War. This change of direction was heavily influenced by the Treaty of Brest-Litovsk, signed in March 1918 which ended the war on the Eastern Front between Imperial Russia and the Central Powers. As a result, the Ottoman Army embarked on a series of territorial conquests in the Caucasus. Erzerum, which had been captured by the Russians during the Erzerum Offensive in 1916, was retaken on 24 March 1918, followed by Van on 5 April and later Batum, Kars and Tiflis. The reoccupation of these former Ottoman possessions, however, brought little strategic advantage, compared with the potential benefits of military success in Palestine.

Also in March 1918, major offensive operations in Palestine became a low priority for the British Army when the spectacular successes of Erich Ludendorff's German spring offensive in France seriously threatened the British Expeditionary Force. By July, it had become clear that this German offensive on the Western Front, had failed. In August, a brief return to the battle of attrition in the trenches ensued until the Hundred Days Offensive, coinciding with preparations for a renewal of the campaign in Palestine, began in August. General Edmund Allenby was "very anxious to make a move in September" when he expected to overrun the German and Ottoman front line, capture the headquarters of the Ottoman Seventh and Eighth Armies at Nablus and Tulkarm, advance to the Wadi el Fara road, and capture Jisr ed Damieh and Es Salt. In addition to defeating the enemy and capturing a large area of their territory, Allenby had an ulterior motive: "Another reason for moving to this line is that it will encourage both my own new Indian troops and my Arab Allies."

Before the Spring Offensive on the Western Front began, the War Office had decided to substitute British units in the EEF with British Indian Army units. The relieved British units were to be retained in Egypt as reinforcements. When the Spring Offensive was launched these British units were quickly redeployed to the Western Front.

=== Battlefield ===
By September 1918 the front line was being held by EEF infantry from close to sea level on the Mediterranean coast, about 12 miles (19 km) north of Jaffa and Arsuf. From this point, the line extended in the XXI Corps area about 15 miles (24 km) south-eastward across the Plain of Sharon, before rising up to a height of 1,500–2,000 feet (460–610 m) above sea level in the Judean Hills for about 15 miles (24 km), into the XX Corps' battle of Nablus area. From this height the front line dropped precipitously down to 1,000 feet (300 m) below sea level, into the area patrolled by infantry and mounted infantry in Chaytor's Force. Here the line crossed the Jordan Valley in the Third Transjordan attack area, for approximately 18 miles (29 km), ending east of the Dead Sea in the foothills of the Mountains of Gilead/Moab.

The Seventh and Eighth Armies Ottoman defenders were supplied by two railways which crisscrossed the battlefield. A railway ran from Haifa on the Mediterranean coast to join the main railway from Istanbul to Deraa, which crossed the Jordan River before passing Beisan to enter the Judean Hills at Jenin. There were also good roads from Haifa and Damascus, via Nazareth and Jenin. From Deraa the extensive railway network, branched into two lines. The southern line known as the Hejaz railway continued east of the Jordan River to supply the Ottoman Fourth Army headquarters at Amman, the garrisons at Shunet Nimrin and Es Salt and the forces scattered along several hundred miles of the southern Hejaz railway. The western line known as the Palestine Railways crossed the Jordan River at Jisr Majami to become the Jezreel Valley railway, as it ran southwards down the west bank of the Jordan River to Beisan, on the western edge of the Esdraelon Plain. From there it turned westward to run parallel to the front line in the Judean Hills, to Afulah. Here the railway branched again into two lines, one line running north–westerly to Haifa on the Mediterranean coast, while the main line turned south across the Esdraelon Plan to Jenin. From Jenin the railway wound through a narrow pass in the foothills to climb to Messudieh Junction in the Judean Hills where it again branched. One line continued south–eastward to Nablus the Seventh Army headquarters, located on the main road to Jenin, Nazareth and Damascus, while the second line ran westward to Tulkarm and the Eighth Army headquarters before turning south to reach railhead behind the Eighth Army' front line on the coastal plain.

The advance by the Desert Mounted Corps' cavalry would take them north on the coastal Plain of Sharon and across the Mount Carmel Range. This rugged mountain range, approximately 7 miles (11 km) wide, stretching northward from the Judean Hills to end just to the south of Haifa, could be crossed by the mounted force through two passes. The northern pass linked the Plain of Sharon via Abu Shuheh to arrive on the Esdraelon Plain south–east of Nazareth, while the southern pass linked the coast via Musmus to arrive at Megiddo on the plain. (Note: Abu Shushe should not be confused with Abu Shushe located between Junction Station and the Jerusalem to Jaffa Road. See Battle of Mughar Ridge) However, the mountainous terrain made the passes easily defended by a relatively small force which would be hard to capture. If the cavalry encountered such defences in these passes, a protracted campaign would require another large infantry attack.

The quick occupation of the Esdraelon Plain, 40 miles (64 km) behind the Ottoman front line, would place Desert Mounted Corps in the rear of the two Ottoman armies fighting in the Judean Hills and in control of their lines of communication. The EEF cavalry would then be in a position to quickly control three lowland areas forming a semicircle around the Ottoman Seventh and Eighth Armies in the Judean Hills, from the Plain of Sharon, across the Esdraelon Plain to the Jordan Valley. They would then control the important Ottoman communications hubs at Afulah and Beisan.

== Prelude ==
=== Attacking force ===
The XXI Corps commanded by the British Lieutenant General Edward S. Bulfin consisted of the 3rd (Lahore), 7th (Meerut), 54th (East Anglian), 60th and 75th Divisions with the Détachement Français de Palestine et de Syrie. These units were supported by Corps Troops' Composite Regiment (one squadron Duke of Lancashire Yeomanry and two squadrons of 1/1st Herts. Yeomanry) and the artillery of the XCV, XCVI, 100th, and 102nd Brigades RGA, and the VIII and IX Mountain Brigades RGA.

The Desert Mounted Corps commanded by the Australian Lieutenant General Henry Chauvel, consisted of the 4th and 5th Cavalry and the Australian Mounted Divisions. (Note: Desert Mounted Corps's Anzac Mounted Division had been detached to Chaytor's Force.[Falls 1930 Vol. 2 p. 667]) Armoured car support was provided by Nos. 11 and 12 Light Armoured Motor Batteries and Nos. 1 and 7 Light Car Patrols from the Machine Gun Corps. (Note: The Australian Mounted Division's 5th Light Horse Brigade was detached to the 60th Division during the first few days of battle. [Carver 2003 p. 232])

A total of 54,800 beds were set aside in Palestine and Egypt, including convalescence and clearing hospitals. There were 22,524 hospital beds available in Egypt. A hospital centre in the Deir el Belah and Gaza area along with stationary hospitals between Kantara and Ludd, could accommodate another 15,000 casualties. By August, casualty clearing stations or clearing hospitals were located at Ludd, Jaffa and Jerusalem, supported by medical stores depots at Ludd and Jerusalem. However, the Australian Stationary Hospital at Moascar only had a few beds available. No. 14 Australian General Hospital on the Suez Canal was full of malaria cases from the Jordan Valley with the overflow being treated in the No. 31 British General Hospital at Abbassia, Cairo.

==== Aircraft ====
On 18 September, the Royal Air Force's 5th (Corps) Wing, and the 40th (Army) Wing, both headquartered at Ramle, were deployed to the area. They were responsible for cooperation with artillery and contact patrols, tactical and strategic reconnaissance, photography, escorts, offensive patrols and bombing operations. No. 1 Squadron Australian Flying Corps (AFC), No. 111 Squadron RAF and a flight of No. 145 Squadron RAF, were based at Ramle, and No. 144 Squadron RAF was based at Junction Station.

Tactical reconnaissance up to 10,000 yards (9,100 m) in advance of the XXI Corps was provided by corps squadrons. No. 113 Squadron RAF along with No. 21 Balloon Company were also assigned to XXI Corps, operating out of Sarona. No. 142 Squadron RAF (less one flight) assigned to the Desert Mounted Corps was also based at Sarona. (Note: See Battle of Nablus (1918) for operations of XX Corps and Chaytor's Force.)

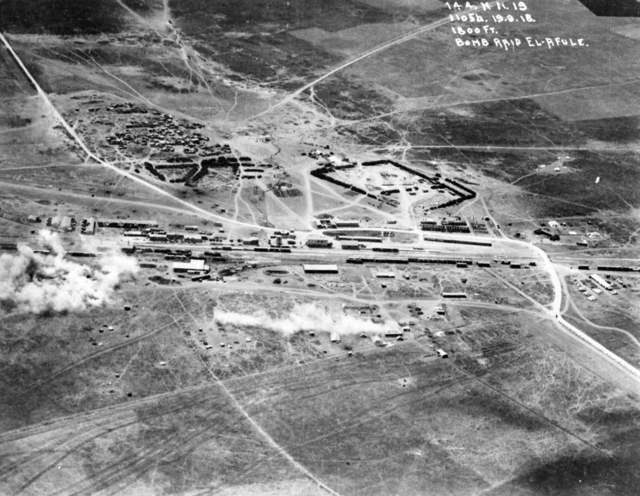
Aerial photograph of air raid on Afulah railway on 19 September 1918. Road to Nazareth in top left corner

The Bristol F.2 Fighters in No. 1 Squadron (AFC) were to carry out bombing and strategic reconnaissance, as well as providing general oversight of the battlefield and reporting developments. Nos. 111 and 145 Squadrons of S.E.5.a aircraft were to conduct day-long patrols over the main Jenin aerodrome, bombing and machine gunning all targets in the area to prevent any aircraft leaving the aerodrome. No. 144 Squadron, consisting of Airco DH.9 biplane bombers, were to bomb the Afulah telephone exchange and railway station, and the Messudieh Junction railway lines as well as the Ottoman Seventh Army headquarters and telephone exchange at Nablus. The newly arrived Handley–Page O-400 heavy bomber (armed with 16 112-pound (51 kg) bombs) and piloted by Australian Ross Smith was to support No. 144 Squadron's bombing of Afulah. (Note: Ross Smith was apparently no relation to Charles Kingsford Smith, with whom he and his brother Keith, flew after the war.)

==== EEF deployment ====
On the first quarter of the front line, stretching from the Mediterranean some 15 miles (24 km) inland, 35,000 infantry, 9,000 cavalry and 383 guns were preparing for the attack. The remaining three-quarters of the front line across the Judean Hills to the Dead Sea, was covered by 22,000 infantry, 3,000 cavalry and 157 artillery guns.

The XXI Corps was deployed without a corps reserve. The 60th Division was positioned on the coast with the 7th (Meerut) Division on their right, then the 75th Division with the longest frontage, was followed by the 3rd (Lahore) Division. On their right, at the eastern end of the XXI Corps and the Battle of Sharon's front line in the Judean Hills, the 54th (East Anglian) Division with the Détachement Français de Palestine et de Syrie, held the Rafat salient. (Note: Mention is made of four British infantry brigades in reserve. [Erickson 2007 pp. 146, 148])

The final deployment by XXI Corps was made during 35 minutes of darkness, between the moon setting and dawn on 19 September, when each division took up a position at right angles to the direction of their frontal attack. They were deployed across a distance of about 10 miles (16 km), leaving stretches of the front line which did not favour a frontal attack, uncovered. Altogether, these stretches amounted to about 5 miles (8.0 km). The sections of the front line which were not part of the initial attack, were to be captured as the attack developed. This would occur during a planned right flanking movement, which aimed to bring all the divisions together and any enemy caught behind would be cut off.

Desert Mounted Corps' 5th Cavalry Division which was to lead the corps advance, was concentrated north-west of Sarona, 8 miles (13 km) from the front, with the 4th Cavalry Division waiting in orange groves east of Sarona, 10 miles (16 km) from the front. The Australian Mounted Division was located near Ramle and Ludd (Lydda) 17 miles (27 km) from the front line. These divisions and their horses were camouflaged from aircraft, in olive and orange groves, where the irrigation channels were used to water the horses. James Calderwood Jones with the Lowland Brigade, Royal Field Artillery Ammunition Column, described the scene at 21:00 on 18 September 1918 in his diary: "What a mass of horses & transport. Stand–to all night, lie down with our equipment on ... horses being hooked–up to the wagons."

All movement had been restricted to nighttime, culminating in a general move forward on the night of 18/19 September. "The night ... was fine and still." The 4th and 5th Cavalry Divisions were close behind the infantry, while the Australian Mounted Division moved up to Sarona. Desert Mounted Corps concentrated, with their supplies being carried in massed horse–drawn transport and on endless strings of camels, clogging every road. The light horsemen "loaded their horses with three days' food, rations an extra water bottle slung on the saddle, and extra bandolier around the horse's neck ... the 4 kilograms weight of .303 rifle ... [in] its bucket close behind the right hand." "All surplus equipment had been discarded in huge dumps".

==== Plan of attack ====
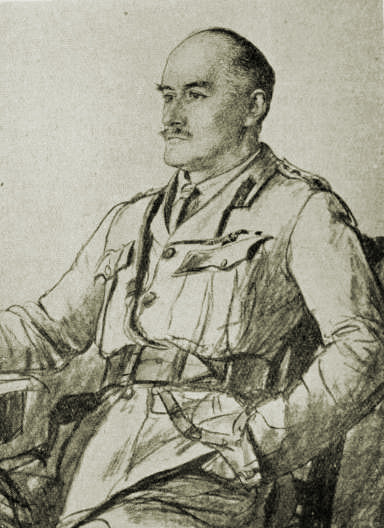
Commander of the Egyptian Expeditionary Force, General Allenby c1917

The Ottoman front line was to be breached quickly by massed infantry in overwhelming strength, supported by the greatest possible weight of artillery at the point in the line where the gap was to be made, while other sections of the front line would be lightly held. After the successful infantry breakthrough, the mass of cavalry would quickly move northwards, avoiding contact so as to reach the rear with as strong a force as possible. The cavalry was to enter the Esdraelon Plain, 50 miles (80 km) to the north, behind the Judean Hills, where reconnaissance had reported an absence of major defensive works.

"Concentration, surprise, and speed were key elements in the blitzkrieg warfare planned by Allenby." (Note: The issue of whether or not it was Allenby's plan has been raised in the literature. [Erickson 2007 pp. 141–2] According to Chauvel, Allenby had already decided on his plan before the Second Transjordan attack in April/May which had confirmed the Ottoman determination to defend the Deraa railway junction and the difficulties for mounted operations in the area. [Hill 1978 p. 161]) Success depended on

- Making the infantry attack in terrain which favoured the attack and the movement of large mounted formations around the battlefield
- Sufficiently intense and creeping artillery barrages to cover the concentrated infantry attacks,
- Destroying or dominating German aircraft to stop reconnaissances revealing the weak sections of the front line and alerting Liman von Sanders to the approaching cavalry,
- Holding the territory captured by the infantry and cavalry corps which would be dependent on rations more than 50 miles (80 km) from their supply bases,
- Deception in the Jordan Valley disguised the move of Desert Mounted Corps from the valley to the coast. Rumours included a race meeting planned for the first day of battle. (Note: The success of Allenby's "deception operations has never been seriously questioned and the assumption that it was a major contribution to his victory detracts from the tactical accomplishments of Allenby's XXI Corps." [Erickson 2007 pp. 144–5])
- Tactical improvements in the British artillery and infantry attack.

On a tactical level, Allenby's battle plans were similar except for the use of horses instead of tanks, to the British Fourth Army's attack on the Western Front during the Battle of Amiens six weeks before the Battle of Megiddo. The similarities include

- Before both battles, the uneven deployments were kept secret by controlling aerial reconnaissance through British air superiority.
- The initial attacks at Megiddo and Amiens were by infantry divisions deployed two brigades abreast, with a third in reserve.
- Both battles began within ten minutes of each other at 04:20 and 04:30, when two-thirds of the heavy artillery engaged in counter-battery work. At the same time a carefully coordinated short artillery barrage by the remaining one third of the available heavy artillery, "lifted and shifted," to the enemy's rear to accommodate the forward movement of the assaulting infantry.
- At both battles, as the infantry attacks developed they bypassed and isolated strong points.

At Amiens, about 400 tanks supported the Fourth Army's advance of about 6 miles (9.7 km) when they broke three German trench lines, killing or wounding 9,000 Germans and capturing over 15,000 prisoners and 374 guns. At Megiddo between 19 and 22 September, Chauvel's Desert Mounted Corps cavalry exploited the infantry's success, advancing 65 miles (105 km). Both the infantry and cavalry corps captured "at least 25,000 prisoners and 260 guns." The Desert Mounted Corps advance, "without the presence of a single tank was to bear a closer relationship to the Blitzkrieg than either Amiens or Cambrai".

Aircraft were also an integral part of the battle plan laid out in Force Order No. 68 when instructions were issued separately.

=== Defending force ===
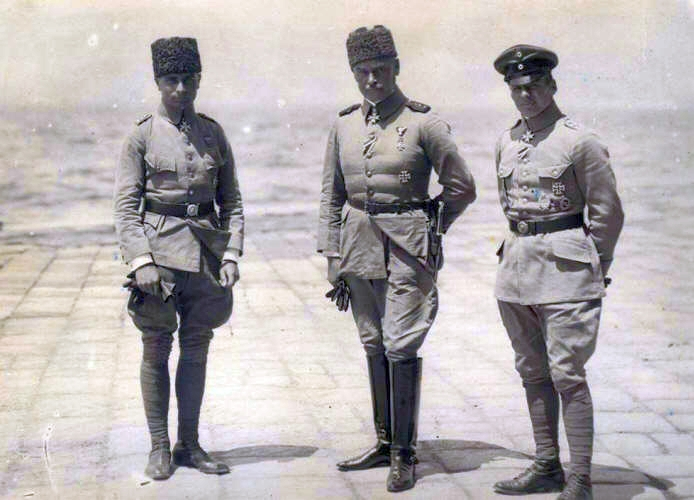
General Otto Liman von Sanders later to command Yildirim Army Group, with Hans-Joachim Buddecke, and Oswald Boelcke in Turkey, 1916

By August 1918, the Yildirim Army Group's 40,598 front line infantrymen were organised into twelve divisions. They were deployed on a 90 kilometres (56 mi) long front line armed with 19,819 rifles, 273 light and 696 heavy machine guns. The high number of machine guns reflected the Ottoman Army's new tables of organization, and the high machine gun component of the German Asia Corps. (Note: The only available German and Ottoman sources to the British official historian were Liman von Sanders' memoir and the Asia Corps' war diary. Ottoman army and corps records seem to have disappeared during their retreat. [Falls 1930 Vol. 2 pp. 494–5)

The Eighth Army's 10,000 soldiers were commanded by Cevat Çobanlı. With headquarters at Tulkarm, this force was organised into two corps. The XXII Corps commanded by Colonel Refet Bey consisted of the 7th, 20th and 46th Infantry Divisions. The Asia Corps, also known as the "Left Wing Group" commanded by German Colonel Gustav von Oppen, consisted of the 16th and 19th Infantry Divisions and three German battalion groups from the German Pasha II Brigade. The Eighth Army, supported by 157 artillery guns held a line from the Mediterranean coast just north of Arsuf to Furkhah in the Judean Hills. The 2nd Caucasian Cavalry Division was available for reserve duty at the operational level in the Eighth Army area.

==== Ottoman deployment ====
Two infantry divisions in the XXII Corps held the shortest frontages of the entire Yildirim Army Group. The 7th Division covered the first 7 kilometres (4.3 mi) of trenches from the Mediterranean coast. On their left, the 20th Infantry Division covered 5 kilometres (3.1 mi) of trenches which was the doctrinal template laid down by contemporary Ottoman tactics. The 19th Infantry Division (Asia Corps) on their left, covered 10 kilometres (6.2 mi), of trenches further inland. In Eighth Army reserve, the 46th Division (XXII Corps) was located 12 kilometres (7.5 mi) behind the front line.

These divisions facing the EEF's XXI Corps, were highly regarded veteran Ottoman Army formations. The 7th and 19th Infantry Divisions, had fought with distinction during the Gallipoli Campaign as part of Esat Pasa's III Corps. The 20th Infantry Division was also a highly regarded regular army division raised and stationed in Palestine. Sometimes referred to as an 'Arab' division, it had fought in the latter phases of the Gallipoli Campaign and had served for a year in Galicia on the Eastern Front fighting Imperial Russia.

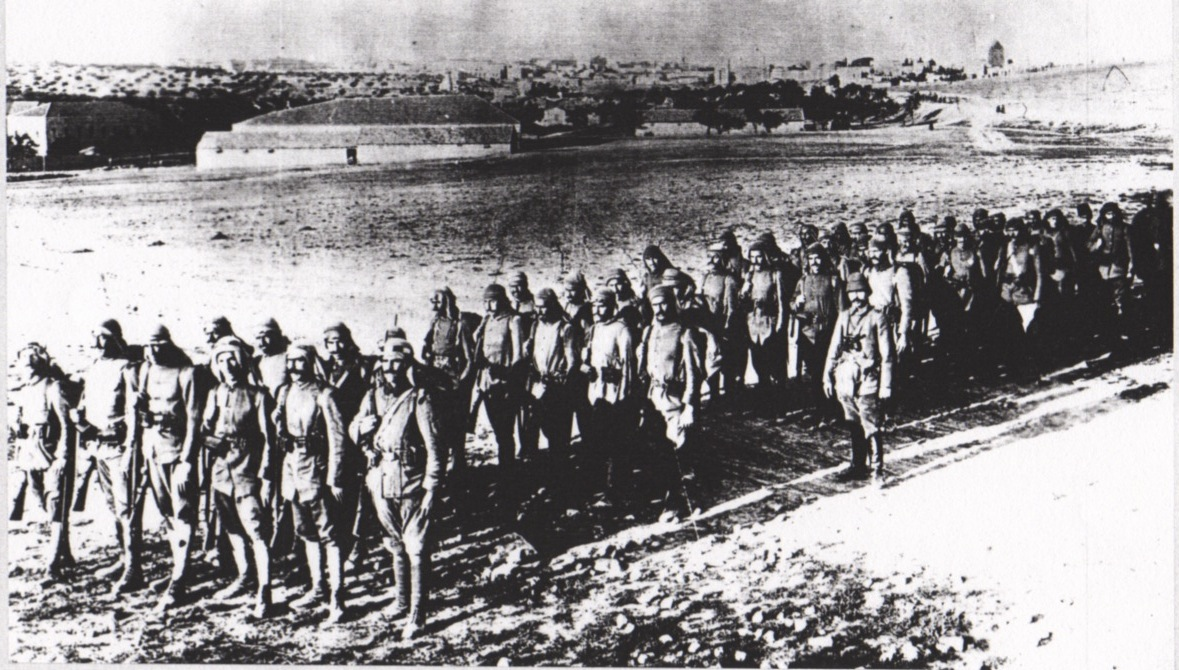
Ottoman infantry column c1917 many wearing Keffiyehs

The adjacent Seventh Army of 7,000 soldiers commanded by General Mustafa Kemal Pasa, was headquartered at Nablus. It was made up of the III Corps' 1st and 11th Infantry Divisions and the XXIII Corps' 26th and 53rd Infantry Divisions, supported by 111 guns. The Seventh Army held the line in the Judean Hills from Furkhah eastwards towards the Jordan Valley in the Battle of Nablus sector, against the XX Corps' two divisions commanded by Lieutenant General Philip Chetwode.

==== Other views of this force ====
The Ottoman armies were under strength, overstretched, "haemorrhaging" deserters, suffering greatly from strained lines of communication, and were overwhelmingly outnumbered by a factor of two to one, by the EEF. Their supply system was so bad in February 1918, that the normal daily ration for the Yildirim Army Group in Palestine consisted of 125 grains (0.29 oz) of bread and boiled beans three times a day, without oil or any other condiment.

The fighting strength of the three Ottoman Armies' (including the Fourth Army deployed east to the Jordan River in the Third Transjordan attack area) has been estimated at 26,000 infantry, 2,000 mounted troops and 372 artillery guns. The nine infantry battalions in Asia Corps' 16th Infantry Division, had effective strengths equal to a British infantry company of between 100 and 250 men. While 150 to 200 men were "assigned" to the Asia Corps' 19th Infantry Division battalions, which had had between 500 and 600 men at Beersheba. (Note: These low numbers of soldiers in Asia Corps units, reflect the high number of machine guns in that corps. [Erickson 2007 p. 132])

On the 15 miles (24 km) line stretching inland from the Mediterranean Sea where Allenby deployed 35,000 infantry, 9,000 cavalry and 383 guns they faced "only 8,000 infantry with 130 guns". The defenders were deployed in a rectangle 45 miles (72 km) in length and 12 miles (19 km) in depth, with Afulah and Beisan 45 and 60 miles (72 and 97 km) respectively, from Allenby's front line. (Note: The front has also been described as 75 miles (121 km) and 90 kilometres (56 mi) long, probably included the Jordan Valley. [Bruce 2002 p. 208] [Erickson 2007 p. 142])

A single trench system was relied on for defence. This inflexible defence meant that "every inch of ground had to be fought for when a more flexible system would have better suited the situation." "[A]t the point where Allenby struck the Turks themselves achieved a fair degree of concentration of their scant resources ... [but] there was no secondary lines of defence nor were there any fall–back positions in the event of a retreat. The Yildirim army intended to fight it out or die."

==== Deception issue ====
Despite the lack of aerial reconnaissance, Liman von Sanders had fairly accurate knowledge on 17 September 1918, regarding the forces deployed against his Fourth, Seventh and Eighth Armies. He understood there to be five infantry divisions and a French detachment facing the Eighth Army with another two divisions facing the Seventh Army and two mounted divisions facing the Fourth Army. Liman von Sanders was not surprised by the strength and location of the attack. He shifted all his available reserves and reinforcements to the west, not to the east. The strategically vital coastal plain was the most strongly defended sector of the front line. Here Liman von Sanders deployed his most experienced infantry divisions supported by heavy artillery.

The position of the Yildirim Army Group's heavy artillery, which should have moved eastwards if Allenby's deception plan had worked, did not change. They remained primarily in the Eighth Army sector. "[T]hree of five Ottoman Army heavy artillery batteries (the 72nd, 73rd and 75th) available in Palestine were deployed in the Eighth Army sector. The remaining two heavy artillery ... [batteries] were assigned to the adjacent Seventh Army. Significantly, no Ottoman heavy artillery ... [batteries] were positioned on the Jordan River front, although an Austrian heavy artillery battery served there."

If Allenby's deception plan had been effective "Ottoman reserves should have been drawn to the Jordan River front; in fact, exactly the reverse happened," when Liman von Sander sent his only reinforcement, the 2nd Caucasian Cavalry Division to support the Eight Army. This division began arriving near Tulkarm on 16 September and the 46th Infantry Division, in reserve near the Eighth Army's headquarters at Tulkarm moved 13 kilometres (8.1 mi) to the south–west on 17 September to a new reserve position at Et Tire, to reinforce the XXII Corps holding the coastal sector. Further, "regiments on the front line were alerted that a major attack was imminent."

It was not surprise as a result of a successful deception which caused the front line to break during the infantry attacks, but a failure to have sufficient reserves available to mount effective counterattacks. The loss of "situational awareness caused by the breakdown in communications," was complicated by a change in the "organisational architecture" of the infantry divisions, when assault battalions were added. (Note: The 3rd and 46th Assault Companies trained in German-style stormtrooper tactics had helped defeat the EEF at the First Battle of Amman during the First Transjordan attack on Amman. The 24th Division's 24th Assault Company (Seventh Army) had helped push the EEF back from Es Salt during the Second Transjordan attack on Shunet Nimrin and Es Salt. [Erickson 2007 pp. 133–5])

== Battle ==
=== Preliminary attacks ===
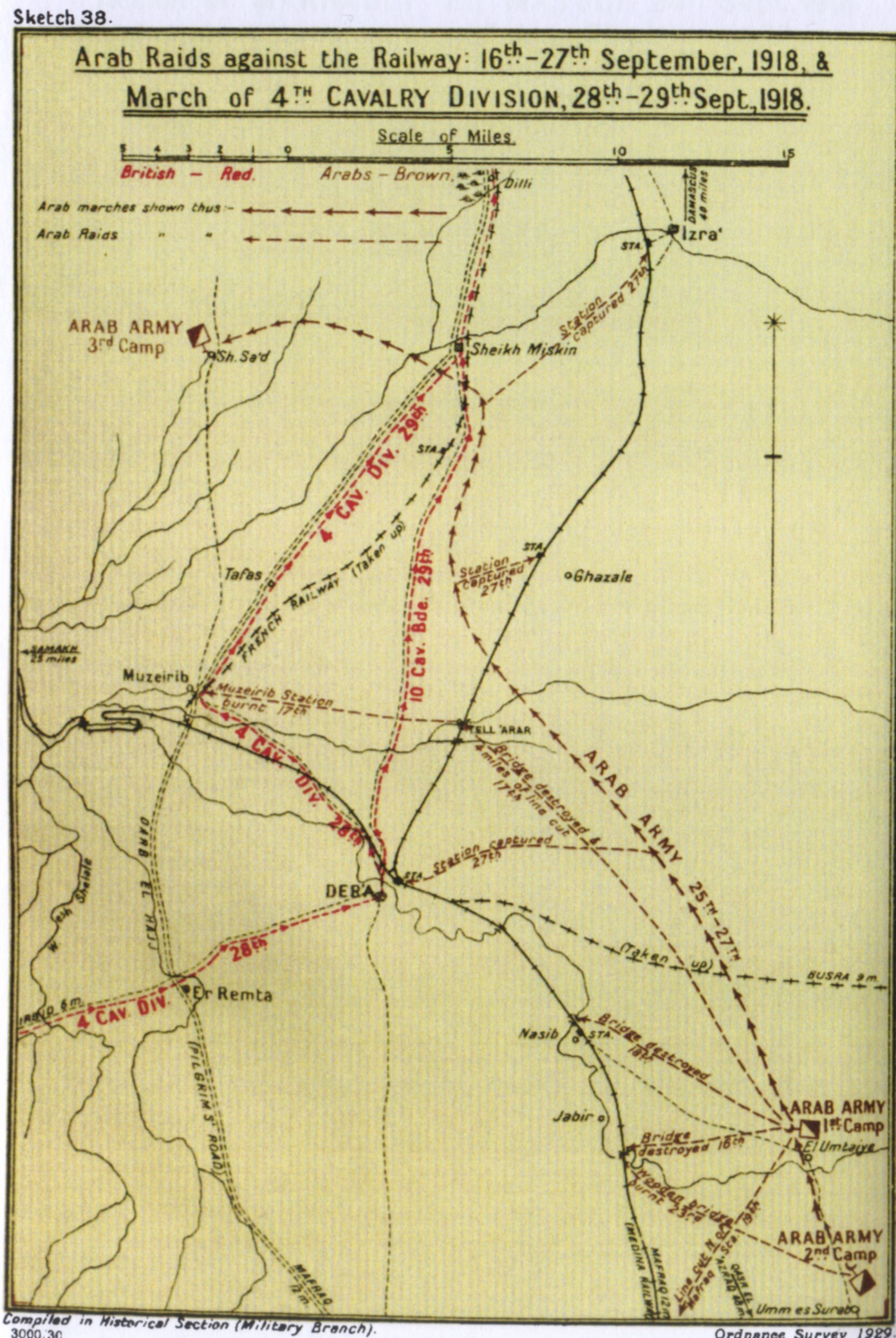
Map 38 shows attacks on the Hejaz railway between 16 and 23 September. South of Jabir a bridge was destroyed, another bridge north of Deraa at Tell Arar was destroyed, 4 miles (6.4 km) of rail line was cut. The Muzeirib Station north east of Deraa (apparently on a redundant French railway) was burnt. A bridge at Nasib was destroyed and another bridge south of Jabir was burnt

Deraa was attacked on 16 and 17 September by RAF aircraft when sections of the railway to the north and west of the Deraa junction were bombed. The railway south of Deraa was attacked on 17 September by a Sherifial Arab Column supported by British armoured cars and a French mountain battery. They left Qasr el 'Azraq 50 miles (80 km) east of Amman to destroying a bridge and a section of the rail line. By 23 September communications to the west, between Deraa and Samakh and also to the north of Deraa, had been restored.

On the E. of Jordan, the Arabs and the Druses are up; and they have cut the Hedjaz railway, N.S., and W. of Deraa. Deraa is the junction, where the railway into Palestine leaves the Damascus–Medina line; so, Liman von Sanders has lost his only railway communications with the outer world. I really don't know what he can do; and I am beginning to think that we may have a very great success. The weather is perfect; not too hot, and very clear.

— Allenby report 15:00 19 September 1918

In the Judean Hills a preliminary attack took place in the Battle of Nablus section of the front line on 18 September. The 53rd Division (XX Corps) attempted to capture the Samieh basin, which overlooked an Ottoman road system near the front line. This section of the front line was required as quickly as possible, so that a linking road could be construction, to connect the EEF and Ottoman road systems. While some objectives were captured during 18 September, the main position known to the British as "Nairn Ridge," remained in Ottoman hands until late in the afternoon of 19 September. (See Battle of Nablus (1918)#Preliminary attack for a full description of this operation.)

=== Bombardment ===
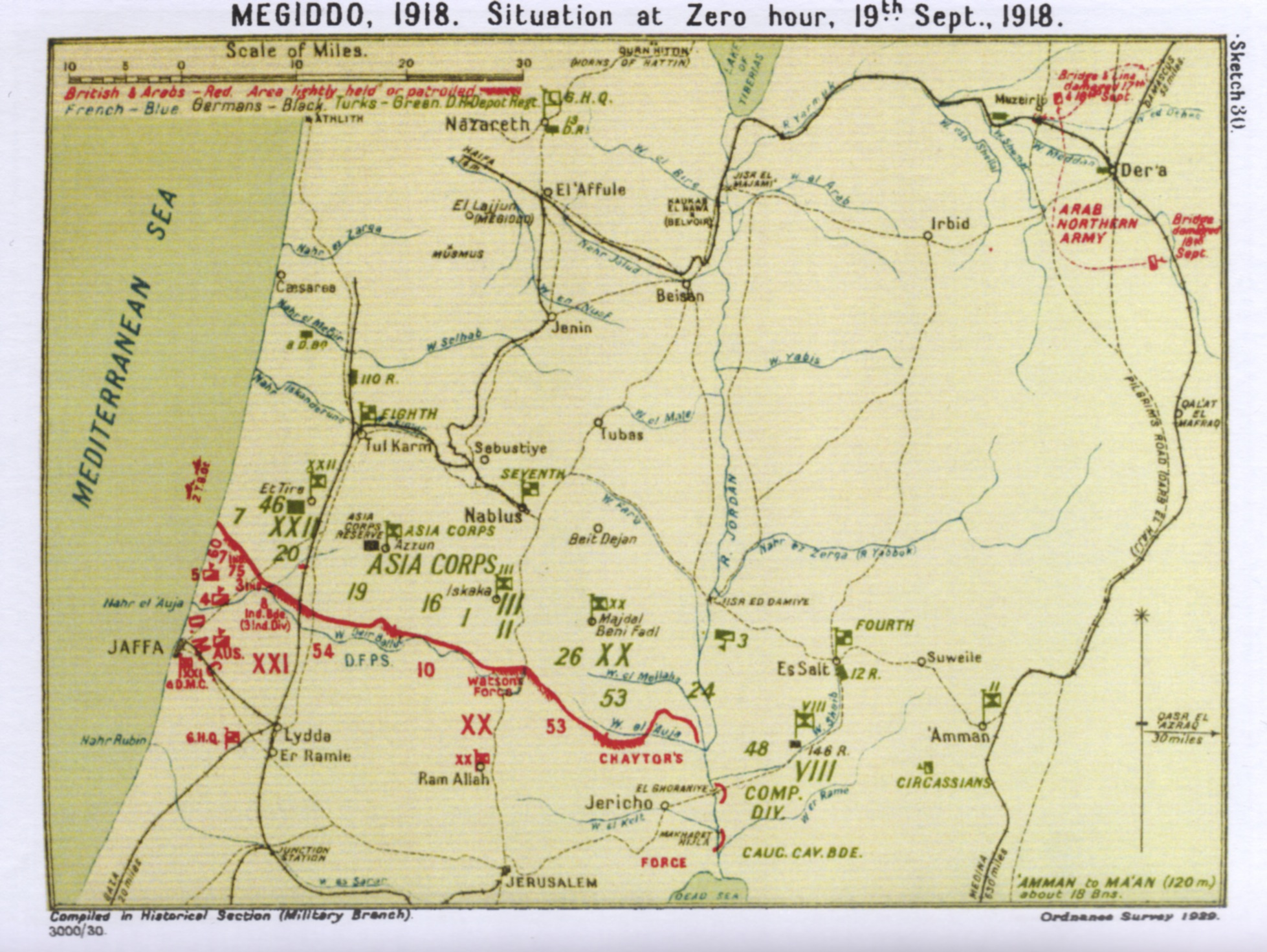
Falls Sketch Map 30 Situation at Zero hour 19 September

The infantry will advance to the assault under an artillery barrage which will be put down at the hour at which the infantry leave their positions of deployment. This hour will be known as the 'XXI Corps Zero Hour.' There will be no preliminary bombardment.

— Force Order No. 68

The artillery bombardment began the battle at 04:30 on 19 September, with trench mortars and machine guns, firing at the German and Ottoman front line and second line trenches. Three siege batteries targeted opposing batteries, while the destroyers HMS Druid and HMS Forester opened fire on the trenches on the coast, north of Nahr el Faliq. The guns fired a half-hour-long bombardment, deployed one to every 50 yards (46 m) of front. This concentrated fire resembled a Western Front style bombardment, where more heavy guns would normally be deployed with one gun placed every 10 yards (9.1 m).

In preparation for the bombardment the artillery was organised by weight and targets. Heavy artillery was aimed at enemy batteries, with some guns and howitzers shelling headquarters and telephone exchanges beyond the range of the field artillery, as well as places where the infantry advance was held up. One 6-inch Mark VII gun, three batteries of siege howitzers, and two 60-pounder batteries were able, without moving forward, to fire on the line from Et Tire to the sea. They could be reinforced by one siege battery and one heavy battery, which would be able to fire on the line Et Tire to the sea within two hours of moving forward, while one siege and one heavy battery were held in reserve. The field artillery targeted the German and Ottoman front line until the EEF infantry approached, when the 18–pounders and the Royal Horse Artillery's 13-pounder batteries, lifted to form a creeping barrage in front of the advancing troops, eventually extending out to their extreme range. This creeping barrage lifted and moved forward at a rate of 50 yards (46 m), 75 yards (69 m) and 100 yards (91 m) per minute in front of the advancing infantry. The 4.5-inch howitzers fired on targets beyond the barrage, augmented by the guns of the two destroyers, firing from the Mediterranean Sea.

When the bombardment began, the artillery range was 4,000 yards (3,700 m) and by 08:00, it had been extended out to 15,000 yards (14,000 m). As no attempt at systematic wire-cutting was made by the artillery, the leading soldiers either cut it by hand or carried some means of crossing it.

=== XXI Corps attacks ===
==== Ottoman front line breached ====
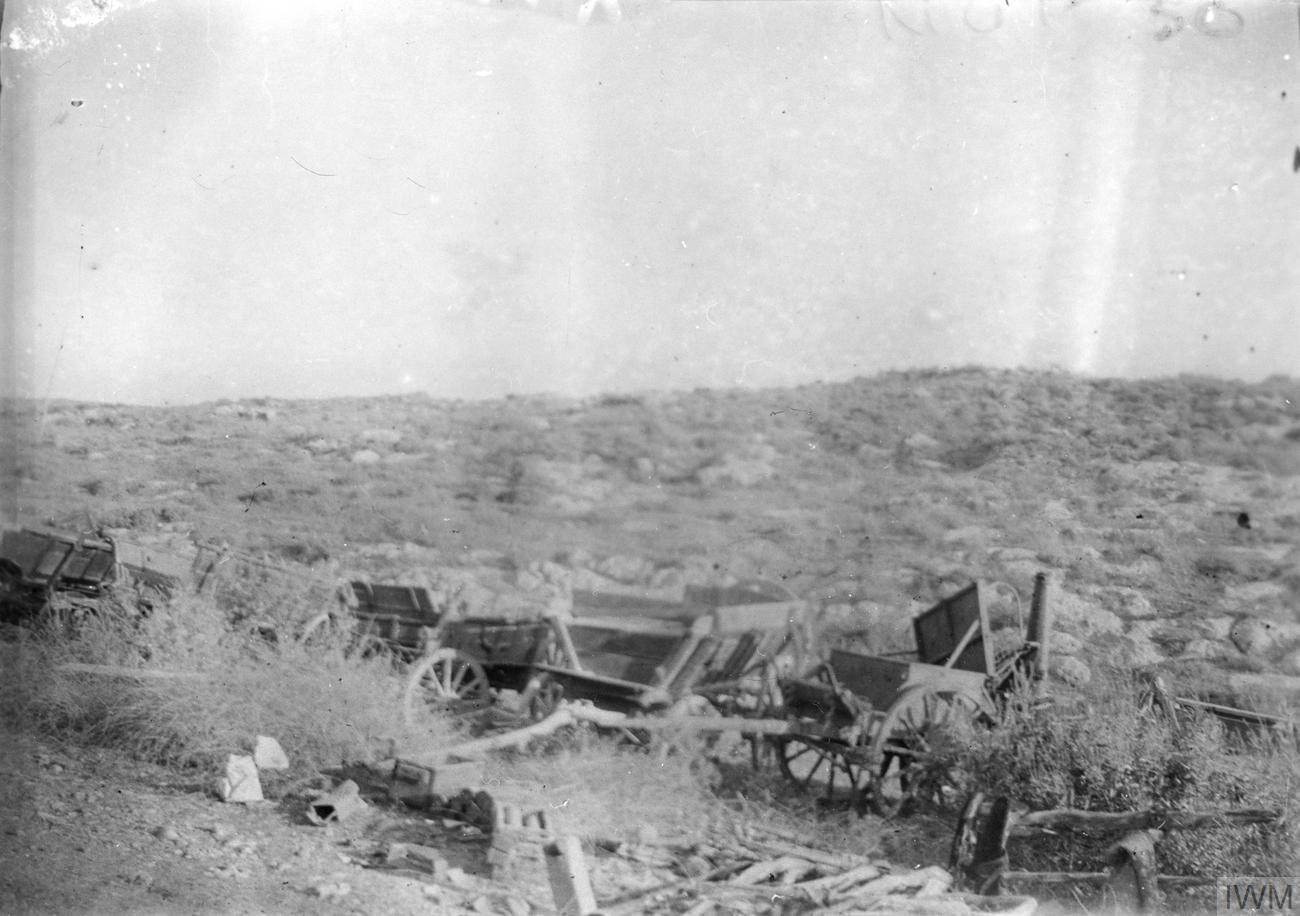
Wrecked transport 1.5 miles (2.4 km) from Tulkarm on the Nablus road

By the evening of 18 September commander Major General J. S. M. Shea's 60th Division (XXI Corps) was deployed with the 180th Brigade in front, ready to attack near the coast with the 181st Brigade in support some 16 miles (26 km) from their objective of Tulkarm. The 179th Brigade was in reserve. The recently formed 5th Light Horse Brigade attached to the 60th Division from Desert Mounted Corps, was deployed behind the 7th (Meerut) Division (XXI Corps) with orders to advance directly on Tulkarm and capture the town.

By 07:20 on 19 September the 180th Brigade had captured the front line defences and about 600 prisoners, one company establishing a bridgehead across the mouth of Nahr el Faliq 5 miles (8.0 km) behind the Ottoman front line. In the process they created a gap for Desert Mounted Corps to advance northwards. The infantry division then turned north-east towards Tulkarm and the Eighth Army headquarters, with the 5th Light Horse Brigade covering the right flank. When this brigade circled around to cut the Tulkarm to Nablus Road from the north, they captured over 2,000 prisoners and some guns. The 181st Brigade marching from the south, captured the town at 17:00 along with 800 prisoners.

==== Attack on the Tabsor defences ====
Falls Map 20 detail. Capture of Nahr el Faliq and advance towards Tulkarm; attack on Tabsor defences and advance to Et Tire

The Tabsor defences consisted of the only continuous trench and redoubt system on this front. Here, the defenders had dug two or three lines of trenches and redoubts, varying in depth from 1–3 miles (1.6–4.8 km). These trenchers were centered on the Tabsor village, and stretched from Jaljulye in the east through Tabsor to the coast. Another less well developed system of defences was located 5 miles (8.0 km) behind. There was also the beginnings of a third system of defences stretching from Tulkarm across the Plain of Sharon to the Nahr Iskanderun. The objectives of the 3rd (Lahore), 7th (Meerut) and 75th Divisions were to assault the first line defences and then to advance to attack the second line which ran from Jiljulieh to Kalkilieh, before advancing to capture Et Tire.

The 75th Division had captured Et Tire by 11:00 on 19 September and the 7th (Meerut) Division captured Taiyibe by 18:00. The 3rd (Lahore) Division captured Jaljulye, the railway redoubt and Qalqilye. By then the Ottoman 7th and 20th Divisions had been reduced to small groups of survivors conducting a fighting retreat. On 20 September the 3rd (Lahore) Division captured 'Azzun, Jinsafut and by 15:10 were north of Qary Hajja, while the 7th (Meerut) Division captured Beit Lid at 18:15 after a hard-fought day-long battle. On 21 September the 7th (Meerut) Division captured Masudiye Station before advancing towards Sebustiye while the 3rd (Lahore) Division advanced to Rafidia, 200 yards (180 m) west of Nablus. By this time the Seventh and Eighth Armies were in full retreat.

==== Attack in the Judean Hills ====
Beyond a wide gap of open plain which did not favour a frontal attack, and on the extreme right of the XXI Corps, the 54th (East Anglian) Division attacked northwards with the four infantry Battalions of the Détachement Français de Palestine et de Syrie (also known as the French contingent or the French detachment) on their right. This force secured the right flank, pivoting to cover the infantry divisions as they advanced towards Tulkarm and Tabsor. All objectives were won despite these British and French units fighting against the German Asia Corps (Eighth Army) also known as the Left Wing Group which included three German battalions from Pasha II. On their right the Battle of Nablus was being fought. Here the XX Corps' 10th and 53rd Divisions were supported by Corps Troops' 1/1st Worcester Yeomanry, the XCVII Brigade RGA, the 103rd Brigade RGA, the 39th Indian Mountain Battery, and the Hong Kong and Singapore Mountain Battery were opposed by the Seventh Army. This subsidiary battle began at 19:45 in the evening of 19 September after the Nairn Ridge was captured.

When the sun appeared the noise of the field guns in front of my point of observation had to a large extent stopped. The field-artillery batteries were moving forward, and that fact alone was sufficient to indicate that the whole line had been carried in one grand impetuous rush, and that the day was ours.

— W. T. Massey, the official correspondent of the London Newspapers attached to the Egyptian Expeditionary Force

The intensity of the infantry battle varied considerably along the line. On the coast, the 60th Division made rapid progress advancing some 7,000 yards (6,400 m) in two and a half hours, while the attached 5th Light Horse Brigade protecting their right flank, rode north–east towards Tulkarm. By the end of the day, the 60th Division had captured Tulkarm, after a march of 17 miles (27 km). On the right the 75th Division fought its way towards the Tabsor defences and Et Tire which they captured, while the 7th (Meerut) Division, on the 75th Division's right, advanced further north of Et Tire, before turning to attack the western Tabsor defences. The 3rd (Lahore) Division, on the right of the 7th (Meerut) Division, advanced rapidly to capture the first line of defences between Bir Adas and the Hadrah road, before turning eastwards to make a flank attack on Jiljulieh and Kalkilieh defences. Meanwhile, the 54th (East Anglian) Division, on the right of the 3rd (Lahore) Division, with the Détachement Français de Palestine et de Syrie on its left, pivoted to cover the right flank of the 60th, 75th, 7th and 3rd Divisions' advances, despite being strongly opposed.

During the first 36 hours of the Battle of Sharon between 04:30 on 19 September and 17:00 on 20 September, the EEF infantry continued fighting and marching forward, forcing the Ottoman Seventh and Eighth Armies in the Judean Hills to retreat. The Eighth Ottoman Army virtually ceased to exist, excepting its Asia Corps, which together with the Seventh Ottoman Army was still in the Judean Hills between Nablus and Beisan, having lost most of their transport. The XXI Corps continued their advanced north–east to drive the enemy into and through the foothills towards Messudieh Junction, and then down the road to Jenin where they were captured by Australian light horse during the night of 20 September.

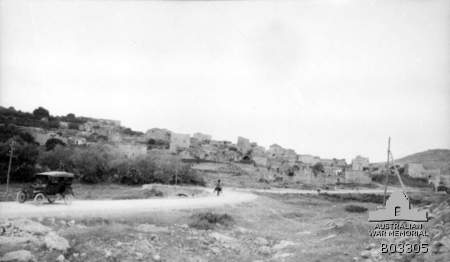
Anebta on the Tulkarm to Nablus road

By 24:00 on 20 September the front of the XXI Corps described a virtual straight line, stretching from the Détachement Français de Palestine et de Syrie at Rafat to the northwest, to Tulkarm. The 54th (East Anglian) Division held Bidya, Kh. Kefar Thilth and Azzun through Jiyus. On their left the 3rd (Lahore) Division was at Felamiye with the 7th (Meerut) Division at Et Taiyibe, Irta. They had taken the village of Beit Lid and controlled the cross roads at Deir Sheraf, while the 60th Division was at Tulkarm and Anebta with the 5th Light Horse Brigade across the railway line to the south of Arrabe. At this time the 75th Division came into XXI Corps reserve at Et Tire.

During these two days of fighting, the XXI Corps suffered casualties of 3,378 including 446 killed. They killed or wounded 3,000 enemy combatants, captured 12,000 prisoners, 149 guns and vast quantities of ammunition and transport. Motor ambulances of the 4th and 5th Cavalry Divisions helped transport the wounded in the Tulkarm area, before rejoining their divisions on the Esdraelon Plain, on 22 September.

=== Desert Mounted Corps attacks ===
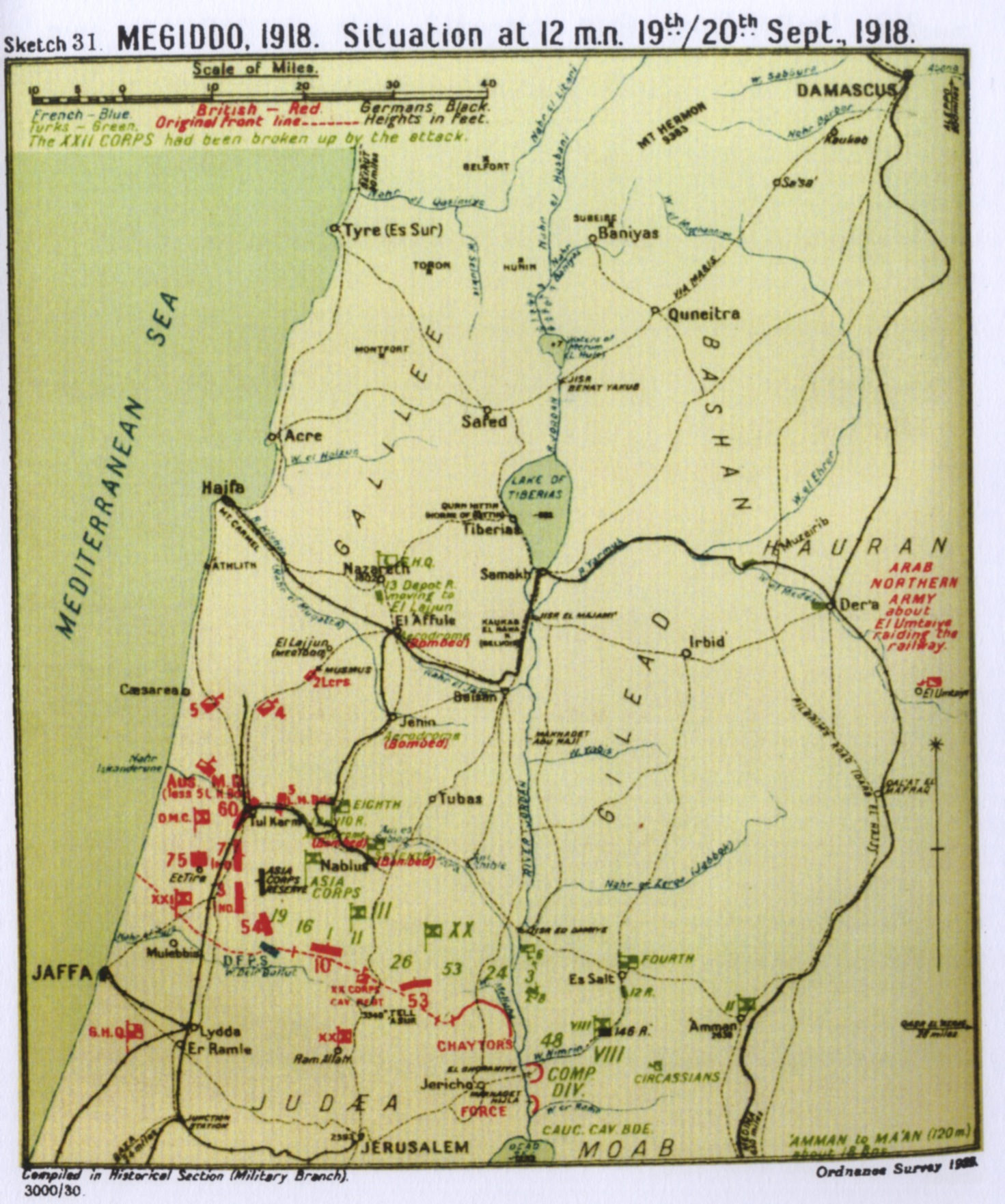
Falls Sketch Map 31 Megiddo Situation at 24:00 19/20 September 1918

The objectives of Desert Mounted Corps were to advance to the north of the Nahr Iskanderun to the Tulkarm to Haifa road, between Qaqun and Liktera, to protect the left flank of the XXI Corps. Subsequently, they were to advance across the Mount Carmel Range, occupy the Esdraelon Plain and capture Afulah and Nazareth. Their successful advance would give Desert Mounted Corps control of the Ottoman lines of communications. By 10:00 on 19 September, the Desert Mounted Corps' 4th and 5th Cavalry Divisions, followed by the Australian Mounted Division had advanced through the gap created by infantry, and were riding north over the Plain of Sharon.

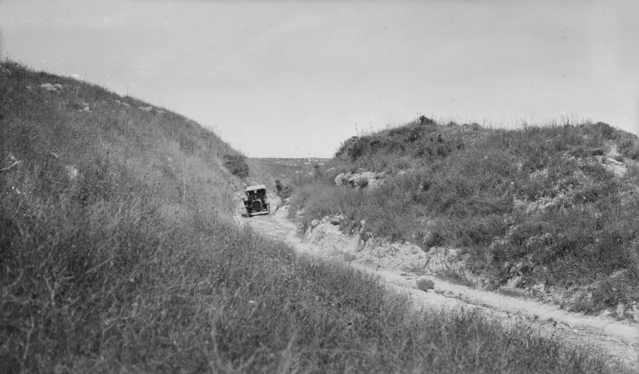
Model T Ford travelling through Musmus Pass

Chauvel commanding Desert Mounted Corps, ordered the 5th Cavalry Division to cross the Mount Carmel Range by the more northerly track from Sindiane to Abu Shusheh, while the 4th Cavalry Division followed by the Australian Mounted Division, rode through the southerly Musmus Pass. On reaching the Esdraelon Plain on the morning of 20 September, the 5th Cavalry Division was ordered to attack Nazareth and capture the commander in chief of Yildirim Army Group, Liman von Sanders and his headquarters 70 miles (110 km) away. This division was to then clear the plain to Afulah, while the 4th Cavalry Division's objective was to capture Afulah. Subsequently, the 4th Cavalry Division were ordered to advance across the Esdrelon Plain to occupy Beisan on the eastern edge of the plain and capture the bridges to the north which crossed the Jordan River. The division was to hold or destroy the Jisr Mejamieh bridge 12 miles (19 km) north of Beisan, and 97 miles (156 km) from their starting point. The Australian Mounted Division (less the 5th Light Horse Brigade) was ordered to send the 3rd Light Horse Brigade to capture Jenin on the main line of retreat from the Judean Hills, 68 miles (109 km) from their starting point, while the 4th Light Horse Brigade garrisoned El Lejjun (also known as Megiddo) and carried out various escort and guard duties.

Between 1 and 30 September 1918 Desert Mounted Corps suffered 125 killed and 408 wounded or missing.

==== 5th Cavalry Division ====
Because of the condition of the northerly pass it was decided to leave divisional artillery to follow in the morning, guarded by the 15th (Imperial Service) Cavalry Brigade. So it was that only the 13th and 14th Cavalry Brigades of the 5th Cavalry Division which entered the Esdraelon Plain on the morning of 20 September. Despite orders to the contrary, the 14th Cavalry Brigade advanced directly towards Afulah, the objective of the 4th Cavalry Division. Only the 13th Cavalry Brigade was therefore available to attack 5th Cavalry Division's objective at Nazareth. This brigade was not sufficiently strong to capture the town and the Yildirim Army Group headquarters and Liman von Sanders escaped. The next day, after the German and Ottoman garrison had retreated, Nazareth was occupied by the 13th Cavalry Brigade.

Subsequently, Chauvel ordered the 5th Cavalry Division to capture Haifa and Acre 12 miles (19 km) away. As the 18th Lancers (13th Cavalry Brigade) advanced towards Acre shortly after midnight on 21/22 September they were attacked by an Ottoman battalion which was routed. On 22 September the Haifa Annexation Expedition was stopped by a strong rearguard with machine guns and supported by effectively positioned artillery controlling the approach road to Haifa. On 23 September, after a successful cavalry charge, the strong Ottoman rearguard position was captured by the Jodhpur and Mysore Imperial Service Lancer Regiments (15th Imperial Service Cavalry Brigade), with a squadron of 1/1st Sherwood Rangers Yeomanry (14th Cavalry Brigade) attached. Together the Jodhpur and Mysore Lancers captured 1,350 German and Ottoman prisoners.

==== 4th Cavalry Division ====
The 4th Cavalry Division following the 5th Division, rode up the Plain of Sharon as far as Nahr el Mefjir. Here the division attacked and captured an entrenched Ottoman defensive position, which stretched from Jelameh, through El Mejdel and Liktera to the sea near the mouth of the Nahr el Mefjir. Afterwards, the 2nd Lancers (10th Cavalry Brigade) led by the 11th Light Armoured Motor Battery, entered the Musmus Pass and crossed the Mount Carmel Range to El Lejjun during the night of 19/20 September. They continued their advance in the early morning of 20 September, to capture Afulah, in the center of the Plain. Leaving the 5th Cavalry Division to garrison Afulah, the 4th Cavalry Division continued their advance eastwards in the afternoon to capture Beisan, having ridden 85 miles (137 km) in 36 hours. The 19th Lancers (12th Cavalry Brigade) advanced directly from Afulah to the north east to capture the Jisr Mejamieh bridge across the Jordan River to the north of Beisan.

On 20 September Allenby wrote:

This morning my cavalry occupied Afuleh, and pushed thence rapidly south–eastwards, entered Beisan this evening, thus closing to the enemy his last line of escape ... The same bombing of fugitives, on crowded roads, continues today. I think I ought to capture all the Turks' guns and the bulk of his Army. ... My losses are not heavy, in proportion to the results gained. I hope to motor out, tomorrow, to see the Cavalry in Esdraelon. The Cavalry Headquarters are at Armageddon, at the present moment.

— Letters from Allenby to Lady Allenby and Prince Feisal dated 20 September 1918

An aerial reconnaissance reported a gap of about 20 miles (32 km) of unguarded Jordan River crossings, north from the Jisr ed Damieh bridge. This bridge had been captured on the morning of 22 September by Chaytor's Force before it turned east to capture Es Salt and capture Amman during the Second Battle of Amman. Chauvel ordered Barrow's 4th Cavalry Division at Beisan to advance southwards along the banks of the Jordan River on 23 September to cut this line of retreat. The encirclement of what remained of the Seventh and Eighth Armies, still west of the Jordan River in the Judean Hills, was complete on 25 September.

==== Australian Mounted Division ====
The Australian Mounted Division followed the 4th Cavalry Division through the Musmus Pass to Lejjun. The 3rd Light Horse Brigade was ordered to attack and capture Jenin and to cut the Nablus to Nazareth road, while the 4th Light Horse Brigade's 4th Light Horse Regiment guarded Desert Mounted Corps' headquarters, the 11th and 12th Light Horse Regiments were deployed to escort artillery and transport columns. The cavalry were required to garrison the captured positions, many miles from base. Here they would be dependent on rations for the three cavalry divisions, being quickly and efficiently transported forward, along their extended supply lines.

Map shows Desert Mounted Corps advances between 20 and 25 September 1918, to Nazareth, Afulah, Beisan, Lajjun, Jenin, Jisr el Majami, Samakh and Tiberias.

Leaving the 8th Light Horse Regiment at Lejjun, the 9th and 10th Light Horse Regiments (3rd Light Horse Brigade) approached Jenin from two different directions, before charging into the town. After a two-hour-long battle the town along with the main line of retreat out of the Judean Hills were captured. Jenin had also been the main supply and ordnance depot for the Ottoman Seventh and Eighth Armies. Among the captures were "very large quantities of valuable stores of all sorts," workshops, three hospitals, locomotives and rolling stock at the station. With two aerodromes, Jenin had also been the main German air base. Here 24 burnt aircraft were counted among the captures. By the evening of 20 September Australian Mounted Division controlled Jenin and patrolled the plain between the 4th and 5th Cavalry Divisions. All the Ottoman Seventh and Eighth Armies main lines of retreat were controlled by Desert Mounted Corps except the Hedjaz railway to the east of the Jordan River.

After being forced out of his Yildirim Army Group headquarters at Nazareth on the morning of 20 September, Liman von Sanders drove via Tiberias to Samakh to organise the establishment of a strong rearguard at Samakh. The 4th Light Horse Brigade was ordered to move to Beisan from Afulah at 08:30 on 24 September and was subsequently ordered at 13:45 to advance to capture Samakh. This town was strategically important to both sides as it controlled a direct road to Damascus. On 25 September, the 11th Light Horse Regiment supported by part of the 12th Light Horse Regiment charged in the pre-dawn while the German and Australian machine–gunners conducted a firefight. After an hour-long battle the light horse forced the garrison to surrender, capturing 350 prisoners at the station and in the town, suffering 14 killed and 29 wounded.

Units of the 4th Light Horse Brigade subsequently advanced along the western shore of the Sea of Galilee, to jointly occupy the town of Tiberias with units from the 3rd Light Horse Brigade, which advanced from Nazareth over the hills. These victories concluded the Battle of Sharon and the Battle of Megiddo.

=== EEF aerial attacks ===
==== 19 September ====
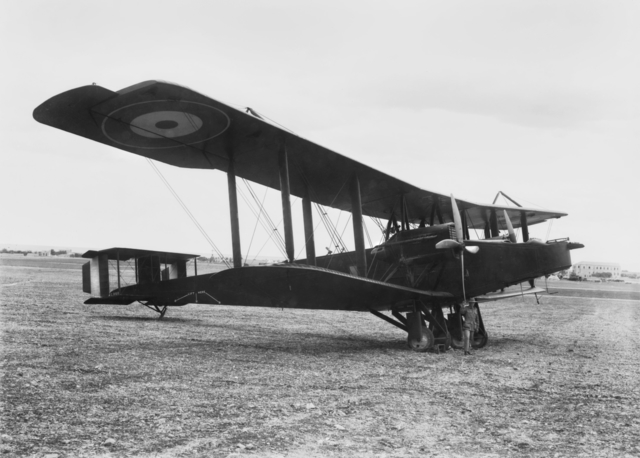
A side view of the Handley–Page 0/400 of No. 1 Squadron, Australian Flying Corps

Airmen of the Palestine Brigade of the RAF, including No. 1 Squadron, Australian Flying Corps, flew bombing raids on 19 September attacking key communication centers at the Seventh and Eighth Army headquarters at Nablus and Tulkarm, which cut communications with the Yildirim Army Group headquarters at Nazareth. They also bombed the main German air base at Jenin and "harassed retreating Turkish troops on the roads."

At 01:15 the Handley-Page bomber piloted by the Australian Ross Smith took off carrying 16, 112-lb bombs to bomb Afulah railway junction and smash the central telephone exchange. At 05:20 Bristol Fighters flying over Afulah saw labourers working to repair the railway station, while at Bir el Hanuta, an Ottoman infantry battalion was seen moving southward to reinforce the front line. Flying west of the railway line, initial movements northward near Bir Ghaneim, already indicated the beginnings of a retreat. At 06:00 a bombing raid by D.H.9s attacked Afulah again. Later two Bristol Fighters reported 5,000 infantry, 2,000 cavalry, guns and 600 transport, retiring in disorder near Et Tire. On this massed Ottoman force, 20 small bombs were dropped and over 2,000 machine gun bullets were fired. At 10:00 the Nablus area appeared quiet, while shortly afterwards Jenin was bombed. At 11:30 the pilot reported having seen the leading cavalry division of Desert Mounted Corps, approaching Liktera on the Plain of Sharon. On the cavalry's right rear at Kakon, Ottoman units were reported alarmed and beginning to move, while further south at Kalunsawe the roads were full of retreating army units.

Five Bristol Fighters in bombing formation, took off at 11:40 with eight bombs each, which were dropped on retreating columns between Et Tire and Tulkarm. They also fired hundreds of machine gun bullets, scattering the retreating force towards Kakon and Tulkarm. At this time, machine gun fire from the ground aimed at the aircraft was fairly heavy, causing a number of casualties to the air crews. At 12:30, a second formation of three aircraft repeated the attack on the same retreating Ottoman column, which had reached the corner on the Tulkarm road. Six aircraft took off in the afternoon, two pursuing the retreating columns north of Kakon heading towards Baka, while four aircraft found soldiers, transport, artillery, horses, and camels moving from Tulkarm to Anebta. These they bombed and machine gunned, in a section of the road where it passed the little Wadi Zeimer, through a gorge with steep hills on either side. Before the column could escape, another formation of seven Bristol Fighters attacked them, at about 17:00 west of Anebta. The evening patrols reported the Ottoman Seventh Army headquarters still at Nablus, but the entire Eighth Army appeared to be in retreat, with their Tulkarm headquarters already captured. At the crossroads of the Afulah and the coast roads at Sumrah, a supply base with hospital and grain dump was in flames and its inhabitants were seen retreating into the hills.

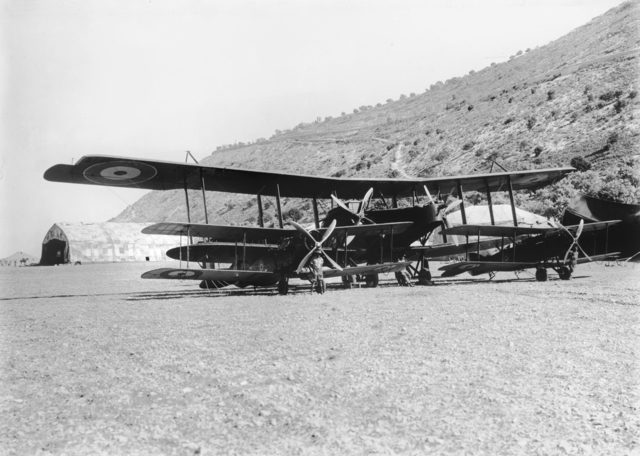
Handley–Page 0/400 aircraft and Bristol Fighter aircraft at Australian Flying Corps aerodrome was frequently piloted by Captain Ross Macpherson Smith

Reports reached Allenby throughout the day, describing the aircraft "spreading destruction, death, and terror behind the enemy's lines." More than 11 tons of bombs were dropped, and 66,000 machine gun bullets fired from the air, particularly on the road from Tulkarm, via Anebta and through the narrow defile at Messudieh, to Nablus. The defile was twice blocked by smashed transport and dead horses, and later cleared. Those who survived abandoned their transport to seek cover in the hills. Over a period of four hours of repeated aerial attacks, the road from Nablus to Beisan about 8 miles (13 km) north east of Nablus "in a narrow defile" was bombed by EEF aircraft. The area became covered with the wreckage of 90 guns, 50 motor lorries and more than 1,000 other vehicles and unknown casualties.

Meanwhile, in the area to the east of the Jordan River garrisoned by the Ottoman Fourth Army, two Bristol Fighters reporting early in the day all Ottoman camps in the area, were quiet. After attacking a mass of cavalry at Ain es Sir they returned to base by flying over the Wadi Fara road. Here they dropped their remaining bombs on a column of 50 motor lorries, moving eastwards along the road towards the Jisr ed Damieh bridge over the Jordan River. A direct hit on one of the lorries blocked the road and in the late afternoon another two Bristol Fighters continued this attack.

==== 20–23 September ====
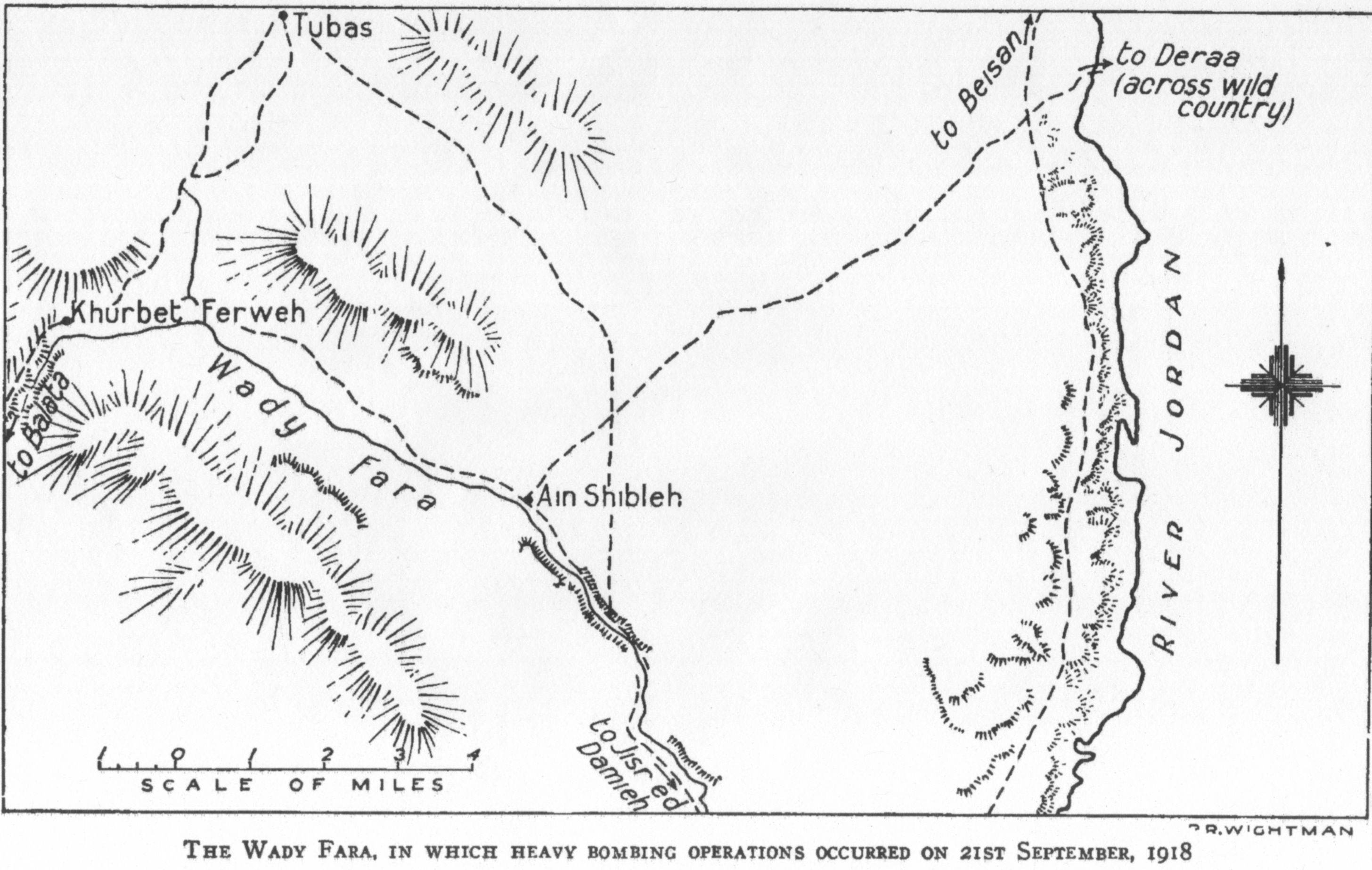
Cutlack Map 8 shows the section of the Wady Fara bombed during 21 September 1918

During the evening of 19 September and early the next morning, Ross Smith in the Handley-Page bombed the Jenin aerodrome and railway station, leaving the aerodrome looking like "a rubbish-heap". A second dawn patrol reported a column of about 200 vehicles spread along 5 miles (8.0 km) of the Wady el Fara road moving from Nablus in the direction of the Jisr ed Damieh bridge. This column was bombed by Bristol Fighters, three making "direct hits" on transport, which blocked the road. Another five bombs were dropped on this target as well as machine gun fire which "created mayhem." Early morning reconnaissance flights reported the effects of the previous day's bombing, in particular between Anebta and Deir Sheraf, where all Ottoman camps were either burnt or empty. From this region northwards, Ottoman troops were seen retreating along the road and railway towards Jenin. At Messudie railway station two trains were being loaded and from Burka northwards the road was full of carts, camels and soldiers. Afulah was a blackened wreck after 24 hours of bombing. Here four trains of carriages without engines were in the station and at the aerodrome four aircraft being prepared for flight were bombed.

Aerial attacks began at 09:00 on the Samaria to Afulah road, when five aircraft dropped 40 bombs and fired 4,000 machine gun bullets at several retreating columns. Between Burka and Jenin, nearly every bomb fell among retreating soldiers, on "congested bodies of troops ... [who] suffered terrible casualties". When they ran out of ammunition, the aircraft returned for supplies before repeating their bombing and machine gunning near Arrabe. Those who survived the aerial attack to continue their retreat towards Damascus, would be captured later that night at Jenin, by the 3rd Light Horse Brigade. The last reconnaissance of the day reported fires burning at Nablus and at Ottoman army dumps at Balata, indicating the whole Ottoman line from El Lubban to the Jordan, was in retreat.

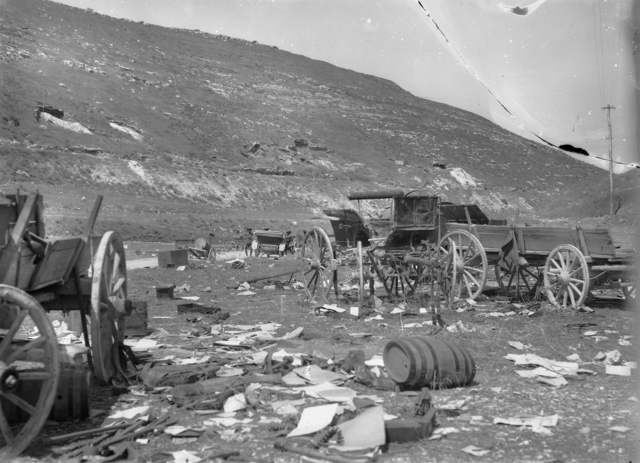
Transport destroyed by aerial bombing on the Nablus to Jenin road

Allenby described the destruction:

I was at Tulkaram today, and went along the Nablus road. It is strewn with broken lorries, wagons, dead Turks, horses and oxen; mostly killed and smashed by our bombing aeroplanes. The same bombing of fugitives, on crowded roads, continues today. I think I ought to capture all the Turks' guns and the bulk of his Army.

— Allenby letter to Lady Allenby 20 September 1918

An early morning patrol of the upper Wady el Fara road from Nablus to Jisr ed Damieh, reported on 21 September a mass of enemy transport, moving along a section of the old Roman road which formed a big 'S'. This stretch of the road from Ain Shibleh to the Jordan River passed along the Jordan cliffs. Here there was a precipice on one side and steep hills on the other. The airmen counted about 600 horse-drawn wagons and guns between Balata and Khurbet Ferweh, a further 200 wagons beyond them, and from Ain Shibleh a mass of cavalry and transport, heading northeast. Five bombs were dropped on these formations along with 600 machine gun rounds, marking the beginning of another "massacre" as the aerial bombardment, which had commenced at 06:30 with the arrival of the first Australian and British aircraft, was continued during the day. These aircraft dropped six tons of bombs and fired 44,000 machine gun rounds. Two days later 87 guns, 55 motor lorries, 4 motor cars, 75 carts, 837 wagons, water carts and field kitchens representing most, if not all of the Seventh Army's transport, were found destroyed and abandoned.

On 22 and 23 September small groups of soldiers, remnants of the Yildirim Army Group, were attacked by aircraft on the Shibleh to Beisan road near the Jordan River. Shortly afterwards a column of several thousand Ottoman soldiers were seen marching back under a white flag along the Wady el Fara road. Meanwhile, east of the Jordan River, three German Pfalz scout aircraft and a number of D.F.W. two–seater aircraft from Deraa aerodrome were attacked by three Bristol Fighters over Um es Surab. During the aerial fight a German two–seater was shot down near Mafrak, another aircraft was forced to land near the railway and an Ottoman outpost, while the third aircraft was chased back to Deraa. Deraa aerodrome was attacked in the early morning of 23 September, by aircraft flying from Ramle. It was attacked again that night by the Handley-Page, which ended the enemy's use of that aerodrome.

=== Yildirim Army Group reactions ===
==== 19 September ====
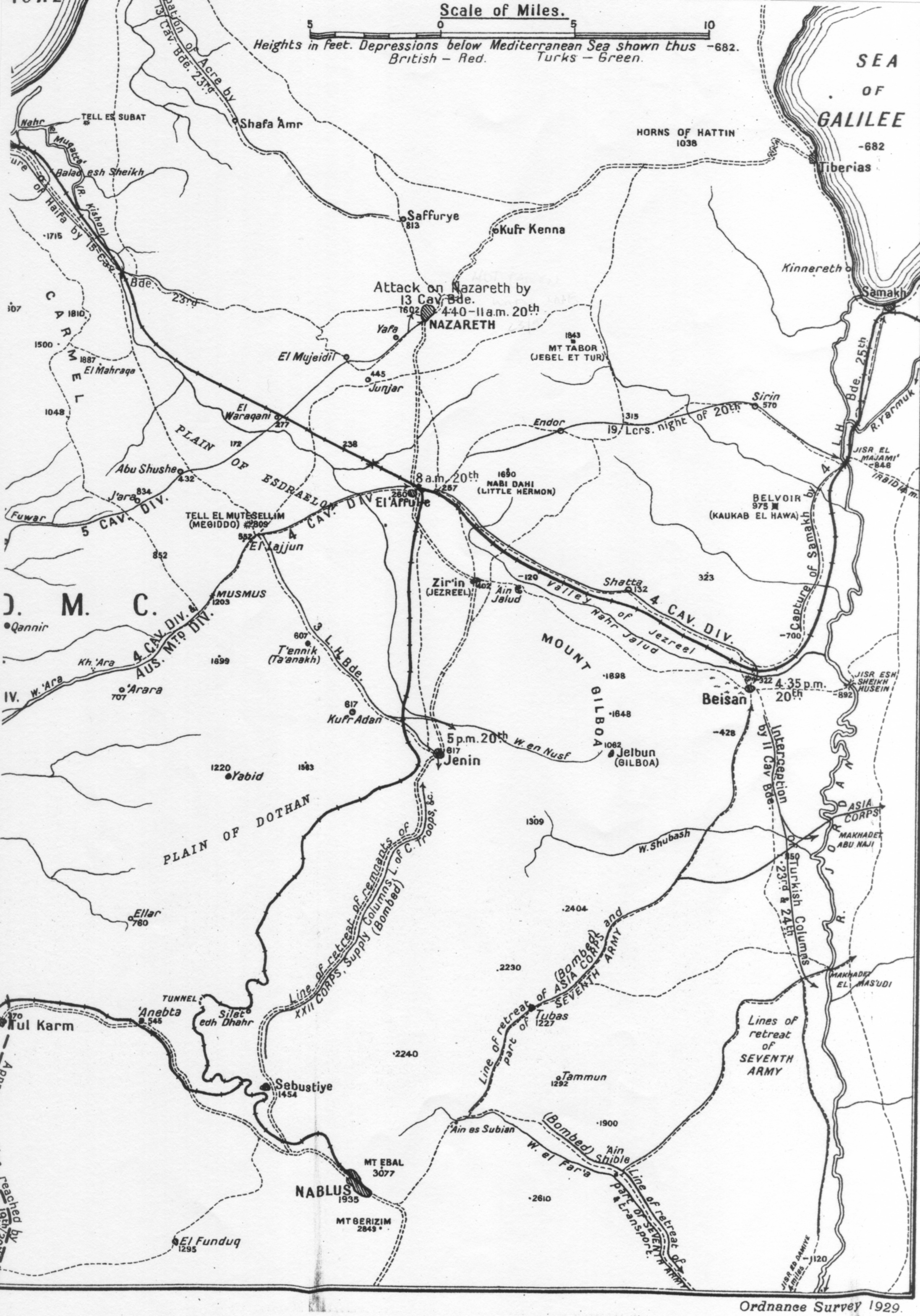
Falls Map 21 shows the three main lines of retreat, the aerial bombings and the retreat of the Asia Corps and the Seventh Army over the Jordan River

By 05:45 telephone communication to Ottoman front line units had been cut and five minutes later all German and Ottoman reserves had been ordered forward. All telephone, telegraph and wireless communications from the Eighth Army headquarters at Tulkarm were cut at 07:00. (Note: "The only useful sources of information regarding events on the Turkish side on the 19th September are the memoirs of von Sanders, and the war diary of the Asia Corps ... [other] records seem to have disappeared in the subsequent retreat." [Falls 1930 Vol. 2 pp. 494–5]) Although the Eighth Army headquarters survived the EEF infantry onslaught, they had lost contact with the 7th and 19th Divisions (XXII Corps). Liman von Sanders ordered the 46th Infantry Division (Eighth Army reserve) forward towards Et Tire. The division's two regiments were ordered forward at 08:00. One regiment reinforced the 20th Division's position at Kabak Tepe while the second regiment fortified Sehpali Tepe, near XXII Corps headquarters. By 09:00 Seventh Army communications with Yildirim Army Group at Nazareth had also been cut. Liman von Sanders learned at that time, from the Asia Corps at 'Azzun via the Seventh Army headquarters, that the trench lines on the coastal sector had been breached and cavalry were advancing northwards. By 10:00 the weight of the EEF infantry and artillery attack had forced the XXII Corps to retreat and Yildirim Army Group had no combat formations in position to stop the cavalry advance up the coast.

The Asia Corps commanded by von Oppen had expected an attack during the night of 18/19 September. The corps' 47th and 48th Infantry Regiments (16th Division) held the front line in the Judean Hills strongly supported by a local reserve consisting of the 1st Battalion 125th Infantry Regiment, part of the 48th Regiment's machine gun company, and divisional assault, engineer, and cavalry companies. Along with the 19th Division, they were attacked at 04:50 by the 54th (East Anglian) Division and the brigade–sized Détachement Français de Palestine et de Syrie . Liman von Sanders ordered the remainder of the Asia Corps to reinforce the XXII Corps by attacking westwards towards Tulkarm. Von Oppen had already ordered the German 701st Battalion and a German cavalry squadron to move through Jiyus to Felamiye, with a reserve battalion of the Ottoman 72nd Regiment and the 19th Divisional Cavalry Squadron, taking up a position east of Qalqilye. At 10:00, the 1st Battalion 125th Infantry Regiment and the cavalry troop reinforced the line to the north of 'Azzun Ibn 'Atme. These reinforcements, along with the 46th Division at Et Tire, caused serious difficulties for the EEF's XXI Corps infantry. Von Oppen dispatched a German lieutenant with clerks, orderlies and transport personnel armed with some machine guns, to Kh. Kefar Thilth to rally the retreating 19th Division, which had been near Jaljulye. The 16th Division continued to maintain its positions, holding the front line but by 17:00 all reserves had been committed. Not long afterwards they were forced to retreat to conform with the XXII Corps withdrawals on its right flank. Von Oppen withdrew his baggage, guns and headquarters to El Funduq and at 18:30, having previously issued orders, withdrew at dusk. He withdrew to a line stretching from 2 miles (3.2 km) west of 'Azzun, through Kh Kefar Thilth, along the heights south of the Wadi Qana through Deir Estia, to rendezvous with the Seventh Army at Kefar Haris.

The whole of the Ottoman Eighth Army's right flank forces holding the front line defences had rapidly collapsed. By the end of the day only remnant survivors were withdrawing across the coastal plain, along the main line of retreat in the direction of Tulkarm and Messudieh Junction. This road was subjected to continuous aerial attacks and aerial bombardments, becoming blocked in the afternoon of 19 September when many casualties were inflicted on the retreating columns.

Liman von Sanders ordered the Seventh Army commander Mustafa Kemal to withdraw northwards, and to send a battalion of the 110th Regiment at Nablus and any other spare troops, to stop the EEF advance to the Tulkarm to Nablus road, at an easily defended narrow, steep sided pass near 'Anebta. At 12:30 Liman von Sanders had also taken steps to defend the Musmus Pass entry onto the Esdraelon Plain. He ordered the 13th Depot Regiment based at Nazareth and the military police; a total of six companies and 12 machine guns to "occupy the mouth of the Musmus Pass at El Lajjun." Meanwhile, the Ottoman Fourth Army to the east of the Jordan River, remained in position holding their ground on the Ottoman left flank.

==== 20 September ====
Liman von Sanders was forced to withdraw from Nazareth in the early morning when the 5th Cavalry Division unsuccessfully attacked the town. During his journey to Deraa, Liman von Sanders ordered the establishment of a rearguard line running from Deraa down the Yarmuk River Valley, across the Jordan River and west to Samakh, around the shore of the Sea of Galilee to Tiberias and northwards to Lake Huleh. If this line, across the two main roads and railway lines to Damascus could be held, time could be gained for the consolidation of the retreating columns into a strong defence of Damascus.

His journey took him to Tiberias and Samakh, where he reestablished contact with his three armies. He continued on to Deraa on the morning of 21 September, which he found to be "fairly secure" and placed its commandant, Major Willmer in temporary command of the whole front from Deraa to Samakh. While there, Liman von Sanders received a report from the Fourth Army, which he ordered to withdraw to the Yarmuk, Irbid, Deraa line, without waiting for the southern Hedjaz troops. During the evening Liman von Sanders met with leaders of several thousand Druse who agreed to remain neutral.

Meanwhile, after the loss of 'Azzun at 11:45 on 20 September and as a consequence of the EEF infantry advances through 'Anebta, von Oppen's Asia Corps was ordered by the Eighth Army headquarters then at Masudiye Station, "to fall back to a line from Beit Lid, 3.5 miles (5.6 km) west north west of Deir Sheraf, to Ferata, 4.5 miles (7.2 km) south south west of Deir Sheraf". Asia Corps was to cover the junction of the Tulkarm and El Funduq roads with the Damascus road for as long as possible before continuing their retreat along the Damascus road to 2.5 miles (4.0 km) north of Masudiye Station. Von Oppen ordered units from the 16th and 19th Divisions (Asia Corps) to take up a rearguard position either side of the El Funduq to Deir Sheraf road while Asia Corps bivouacked near Balata. During the night of 20/21 von Oppen was ordered to send his German troops back to Deir Sheraf to cover the Seventh Army retreat, but he refused. The 16th Division conducted a fighting retreat on 20 and 21 September, during which most of their artillery was lost.

Remnants of the XXII Corps (Eighth Army) which had retreated north along the main Damascus road during 20 September, were captured that night by the 3rd Light Horse Brigade at Jenin.

==== 21 September ====
Falls Map 33 Megiddo Situation at 21:00 21 September 1918

During the night, the Asia Corps lost touch with the 16th and 19th Divisions, but following the direct orders of Liman von Sanders, these divisions withdrew to the west of Nablus. Here von Oppen got in contact with them during the morning of 21 September. At that time the remains of the 702nd and 703rd Battalions were reformed into one battalion, supported by a rifle company, a machine gun company and a trench mortar detachment. The 701st Battalion with its machine gun company of six guns, a troop of cavalry, an infantry-artillery platoon with two mountain guns or howitzers and a trench mortar section with four mortars and a cavalry squadron, remained intact.

Meanwhile, the bulk of the Seventh Army was retreating down the Wadi el Fara road, towards the Jordan River. Here it was heavily bombed and strafed by machine guns, from aircraft. During these aerial attacks the Seventh Army guns and transport were destroyed, leaving the road blocked. The survivors were forced to turn north at 'Ain Shible in order to continue their retreat towards Beisan. Having got through before the road was blocked, the 53rd Division continued down the Wadi el Fara road, but was attacked and captured by Chaytor's Force on 22 September, during their attack on the Jisr ed Damieh bridge. The Asia Corps also withdrawing down the Wadi el Fara road towards the Jordan River, was forced to turn north-east at 'Ain Shible, south east of Tammun, towards Beisan. At 10:00 von Oppen had been informed that the EEF was closing in on Nablus and the Wadi el Fara road was blocked. He decided to retreat via Beit Dejan 7 miles (11 km) east southeast of Nablus to the Jordan River at Jisr ed Damieh, but found this route also cut. He then ordered a retreat via Mount Ebal, leaving behind all wheeled transport, including guns and baggage. During this withdrawal, the column suffered casualties from artillery fire. The 701st and the combined 702nd and 703rd Battalions bivouacked that night at Tammun with the 16th and 19th Divisions at Tubas.

The Eighth Army headquarters at Nablus was abandoned at 15:00 on 21 September, when Jevad join the Seventh Army headquarters, accompanied by his chief of staff and some staff officers. This move signalled the end of the Ottoman Eighth Army. The 20th and 21st Regiments existed only until the afternoon. All surviving remnants were in retreat and threatened with encirclement, including the Asia Corps. Von Oppen with 700 German and 1,300 Ottoman soldiers of the 16th and 19th Divisions, was retreating northwards towards Beisan when he learned it had fallen. He decided to advance during the night of 22 September to Samakh where he correctly guessed Liman von Sanders would order a rearguard action. However, Jevad, (also known as Jevat Pasa and Cevat Pasa) the commander of the Eighth Army ordered him to cross the Jordan River. (Note: Liman von Sanders was very critical of Jevad's intervention which considerably weakened the Samakh position, but von Oppen would have had to break through the 3rd Light Horse Brigade at Jenin and the 4th Cavalry Division at Beisan to get to Samakh. [Falls 1930 Vol. 2 p. 546])

==== 22–24 September ====
Between 21 and 23 September, the 1st and 11th Divisions III Corps (Seventh Army) fought rearguard actions from Tubas to the Jordan River, which delayed the EEF cavalry encirclement, and covered the retreat of the remaining units of the Ottoman Seventh Army across the Jordan River. The Seventh Army lost 1,500 prisoners, captured by the XX Corps cavalry on 23 and 24 September during the Battle of Nablus.

By 22 September, the Asia Corps' 16th Infantry Division had been reduced to less than 280 officers and men and two days later, on 24 September they were relying on machine guns for defence, when "enemy horse units [were] everywhere." Their divisional headquarters joined the surviving headquarters elements of the 19th Division only to be attacked and overrun by EEF cavalry. However, the 16th Division's 2nd and 3rd Battalions of the 125th Infantry Regiment with their combined assault and engineers company survived to fight a delaying action to Damascus. They were captured there on 1 October 1918.

== Aftermath ==
The King congratulated Allenby:

It is with feelings of pride and admiration that we at home have received the news of the ably conceived and brilliantly carried out operations in which the British Indian and Allied forces under your command with the support of the Royal Navy have gained a complete victory over the enemy ...

— King George V telegram to Allenby 23 September

In a congratulatory telegram from the Chief of the General Staff at the War Office on 23 September, Allenby had been asked to consider a "cavalry raid on Aleppo." Sir Henry Wilson the then Chief of the General Staff went on to describe the effect such an advance would have on the campaign in the Caucasus and in North West Persia, and the moral and political consequences for the Ottoman Empire. He assured Allenby that the War Office would accept the risks involved in such a venture. At this early stage in operations, Allenby's focus remained on the battle of Megiddo then unfolding, and on the pursuit to Damascus by Desert Mounted Corps which would be the next step.

The 7th Brigade of the 3rd (Lahore) Division was detached to the Desert Mounted Corps to garrison the areas occupied by the mounted corps. This infantry brigade marched via Jenin to Nazareth and on to Samakh, arriving there on 28 September, while Desert Mounted Corps was in pursuit of the remnants Yildirim Army Group towards Damascus. By 29 September, the 7th (Meerut) Division was concentrated at Haifa with the XXI Corps Cavalry Regiment at Acre in preparation for their march to Beirut and on to Tripoli during the Pursuit to Haritan.

=== Ottoman and German prisoners ===
Between 19 and 21 September 15,000 prisoners had been captured. Some of these were guarded by the 7th Brigade, 3rd (Lahore) Division which had been detached to Desert Mounted Corps to garrison the Esdraelon Plain. They took over responsibility for a compound of 300 prisoners from Australian light horsemen. Shortly afterwards, another 200 Germans arrived followed by large numbers of Turks, Armenian, Arabs, Jews and Bedouins prisoners. During the night of 26/27 September a further 3,500 prisoners were added into the compound and "packed in shoulder to shoulder. All sanitary discipline had vanished and dysenteric excrement covered every open space." Three lorries arrived with rations of army biscuits, bully beef and onions for the prisoners, and after they had all been fed, an escort arrived to move them.

=== Spanish flu ===
With the rapid advance, "disorganization and improvisation in the medical service are inevitable," with clearing stations lacking "the most elementary comforts." These problems were multiplied by the huge numbers of prisoners, among whom many became ill with Spanish flu. In a hospital located in a convent in Haifa about 3,000 sick were treated. "It is the survival of the fittest, if one is able to be up & about there is a chance of getting something to eat, but if stretcher case, you get no attention whatever, the staff can't cope with the numbers."

There are too many sick to go under the scanty canvas [in a field ambulance]. The majority are Turkish prisoners. You will see them herded under tarpaulins beyond the marquees; and where no tarpaulins are available, they lie sick in the sun. Sandfly fever, relapsing fever, influenza and malaria (malignant and benign), dysentery, have hit the spent Turkish Army hard. So have they ours; but not to the same degree. The Turks are "dying like flies", as they say. The more acute cases are put in limbers, G.S. wagons, lorries, and pushed down. A cot full of comatose Turks, sick unto death, lumbering along in the dust, is a common sight. Even our own sick are evacuated in any vehicle that passes the station. There are not motor ambulances for all, and there are no ambulance trains on this route. An orderly in the road stops all down-passing vehicles and demands if they can carry sick. Of wounded there are almost none.

— Lieutenant Dinning during his road journey through the region in September 1918

With a temperature of 103 °F (39 °C), Warrant Officer Patrick M. Hamilton, serving with the 4th Light Horse Field Ambulance, (Australian Mounted Division) became one of the earlier cases of Spanish flu, being reported sick on 20 September. At 18:00 on 21 September he was evacuated from Jenin, sitting up in one of the returning supply lorries, to the Australian Receiving Station at Tulkarm. He became very sick the next day "with pains all over, especially in the back" and became a stretcher case just before the receiving station was taken over by the 4th Cavalry Divisional Receiving Station, where he remained until 24 September. From Tulkarm he was evacuated to the 15th British Casualty Clearing Station at Wilhelma in a motor ambulance, then by train to the 26th British Casualty Clearing Station at Ludd, before arriving by troop train back at the 47th Stationary Hospital at Gaza on 27 September, seven days after falling ill. Here he slowly recovered, before being evacuated once more, by train on 1 October back across the Sinai 120 miles (190 km), to be admitted to the 24th British Stationary Hospital at Kantara, where he recovered. He rejoined the 4th Light Horse Field Ambulance in the middle of November, arriving by boat at Tripoli.
