= Tabsur =

Tabsur (Khirbat 'Azzun) (تبصر(خربة عزون Tabsar, Khirbet 'Azzun
- Village
- Etymology: from personal name
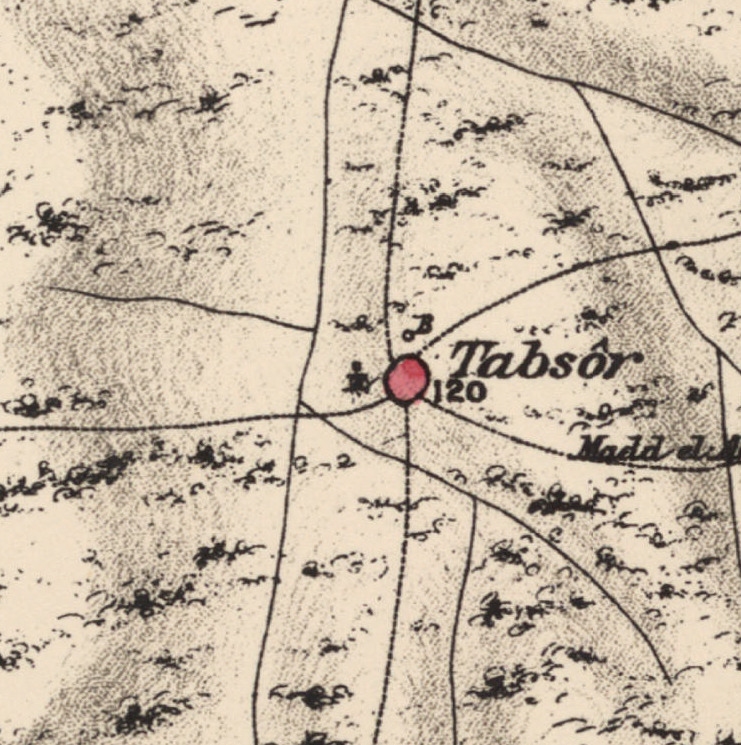
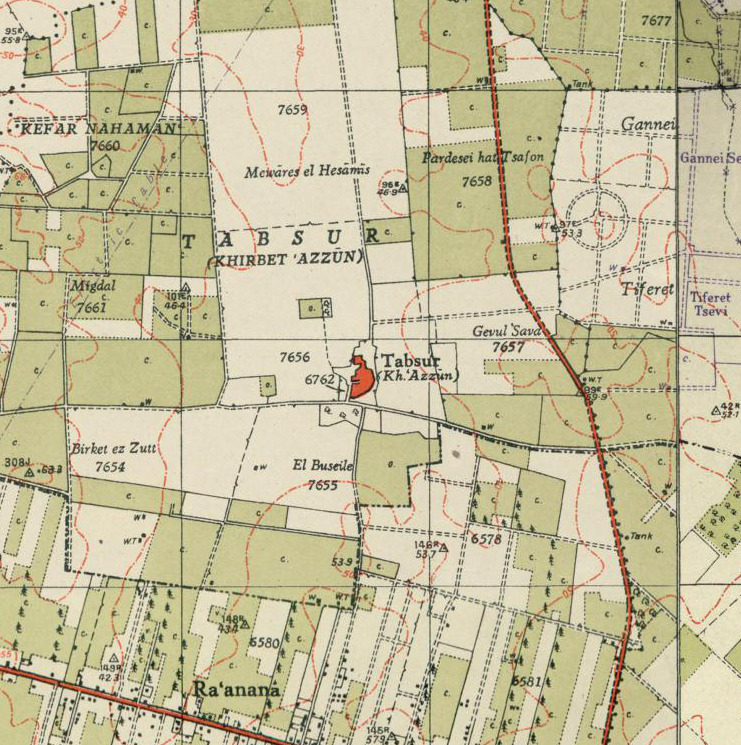
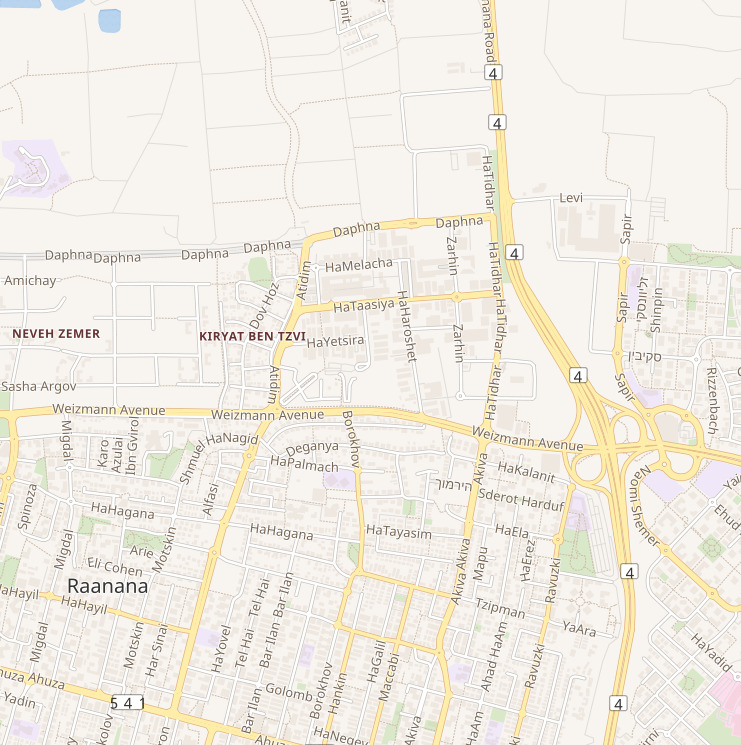
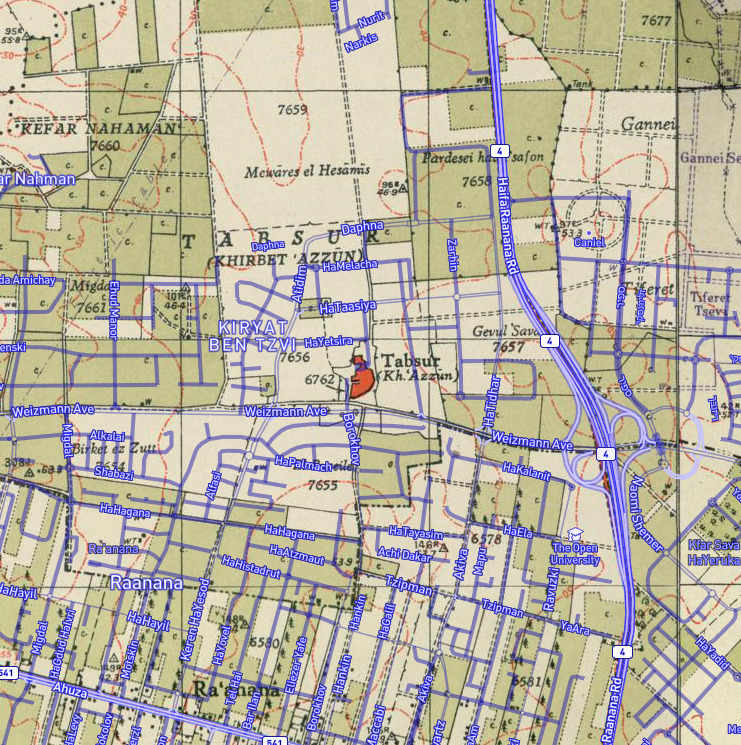
- 1870s map 1940s map modern map 1940s with modern overlay map A series of historical maps of the area around Tabsur (click the buttons)

- Location within Mandatory Palestine
- Coordinates: 32°11′38″N 34°52′44″E
- Palestine grid: 138/177
- Geopolitical entity: Mandatory Palestine
- Subdistrict: Tulkarm
- Date of depopulation: 3 April 1948

Area
  - Total: 5,328 dunams (5.328 km^{2}; 2.057 sq mi)
- Cause of evacuation: Expulsion by the Jewish Yishuv forces
- Current Localities: Ra'anana and Batzra

Tabsur (Arabic: تبصر), also Khirbat 'Azzun (Arabic: خربة عزون), was a Palestinian village located 19 kilometres southwest of Tulkarm. In 1931, the village had 218 houses and an elementary school for boys. Its Palestinian population was expelled during the Nakba.

== History ==
The site of Tabsur contained archaeological remains, including the foundations of a building, a well, fragments of mosaic pavement, and tombs.

In the 1860s, the Ottoman authorities granted 'Azzun an agricultural plot of land in the former confines of the Forest of Arsur (Ar. Al-Ghaba) in the coastal plain, west of the village. Residents of 'Azzun then repopulated the archaeological site of Tabsur. Describing this settlement according to local tradition, Ayalon and Marom noted,

On a summer day sometime in the late 1860s, a group of shabab (youth) from the Jabal Nablus (Samaria) highland left their village of ʿAzzun and descended to the sparsely populated and wooded coastal plain. They arrived at the long-abandoned site of Tubsur [...] Pitching their tents among the ancient ruins, they set about demarcating ʿAzzun’s new land claim in the Forest of Arsuf (al-ghaba) [...]. They debarked the old oak trees as boundary marks, one village elder narrated, ‘and after that they began improving the land by chopping down the trees and thorns’.

Like colonists settling on a land for the first time, they built an eponymous village, Khirbat ʿAzzun, and began making a living from growing grains and watermelons intended for faraway markets. ‘Its borders extended north as far as the lands of Miska, al-Tira and the Swamp (al-Bassa)’, the elder reminisced; ‘as far south as the tribe of Abu Kishk and the Yarkon (ʿAuja river), westward up to the ghaba of the people of Kafr ʿAbbush (Ghabat al-ʿAbabsha) and Sidna ʿAli, and eastward up to the village of Kafr Saba’.

The first residents dug up ancient building stones from among the ruins and used them to construct temporary buildings roofed over with branches.

In the 1870s, Tabsur was described as a moderate-sized hamlet with a well to the north. It was later classified as a hamlet by the Palestine Index Gazetteer.

=== British Mandate era ===
According to Ayalon and Marom, "The frontline trenches of the Great War carved open wounds in the plain’s soil, destroying and temporarily depopulating Khirbat ʿAzzun, Kfar Sava and some other nearby villages."

In the 1922 census of Palestine there were 709 villagers; 700 Muslims and 9 Christians, (where the Christians were all Orthodox,) increasing in 1931 census to 994; 980 Muslims and 14 Christians, in 218 houses.

In the 1940s, Khirbat ʿAzzun was home to 300 people, with shrinking land, and poor infrastructure "The village improved its economic base by adopting new agricultural methods and benefiting from a degree of cooperation with Raʿanana. Toward the end of the period, the village owned a fine mosque, a school, a couple of guest rooms (dawawin), twelve plots of citrus plantation (bayyarat), a mechanized well, and a grocery shop."

In the 1944/45 statistics, a total of 1,602 dunums were allocated to cereals, while 24 dunums were irrigated or used for orchards. 29 dunams were classified as built-up (urban) area.

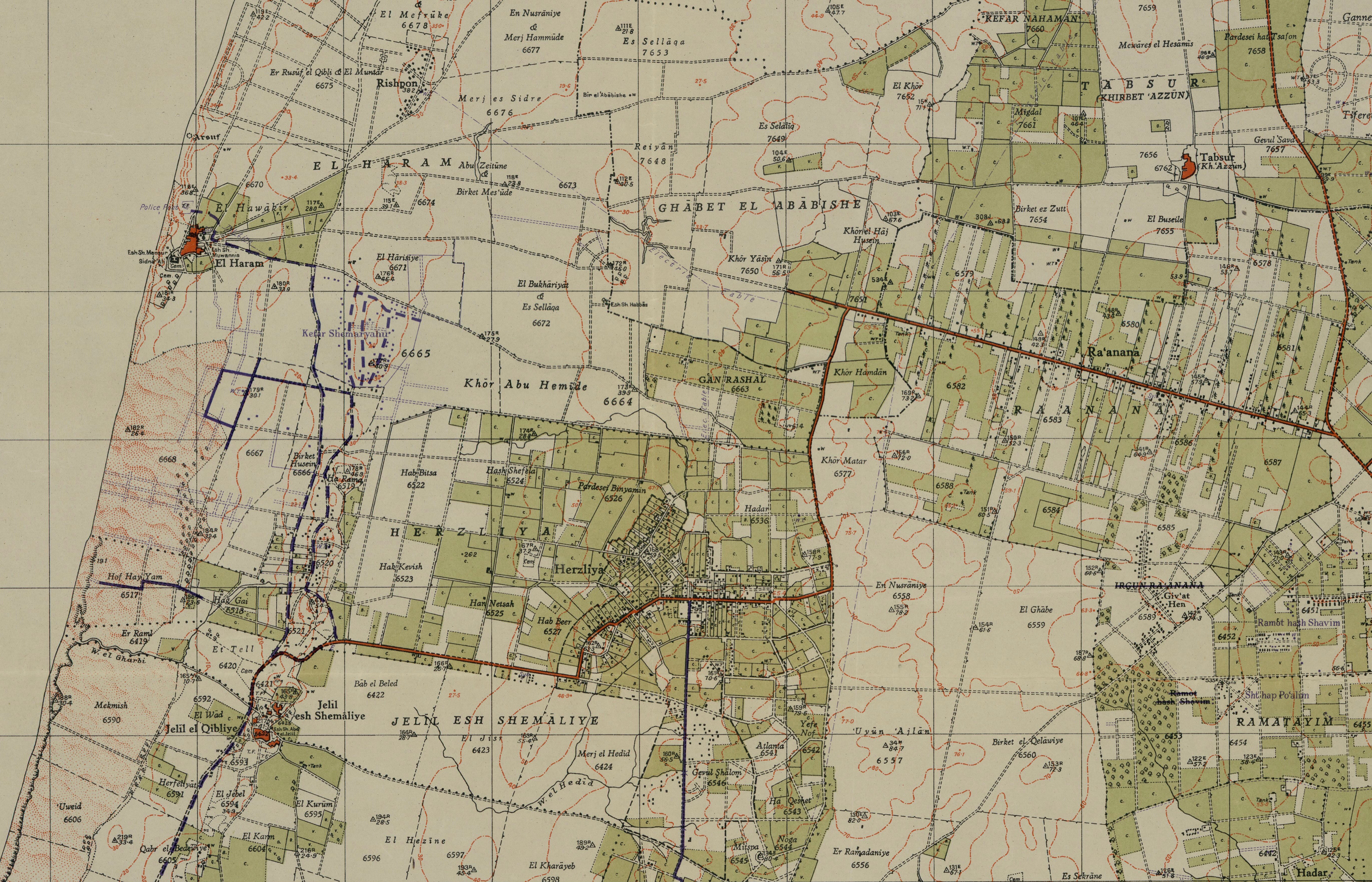
Tabsur 1942 1:20,000 (top left)

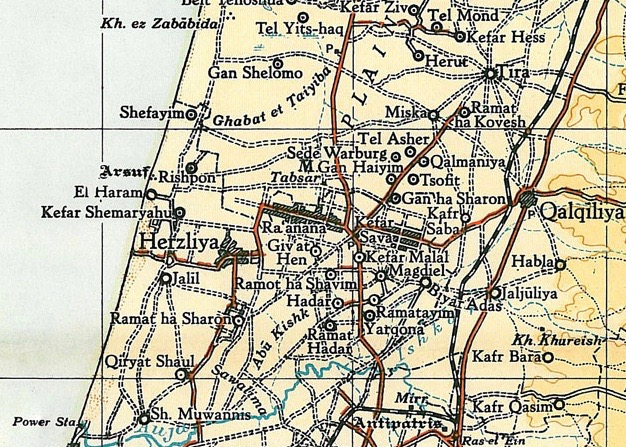
Tabsur 1945 1:250,000

=== 1948, aftermath ===
The Arabs of Tabsur were ordered to leave by the Haganah on 3 April 1948, as part of Haganas policy of clearing out the Arab villages on the coastal plain. The villagers left on 16 April 1948.

A detailed report by Ayalon and Marom, reads:

On 16 April, Tiroshi reported the emptying of the village in a terse, unemotional tone: ‘Khirbat ʿAzzun was evacuated by its last inhabitants. The reason we gave for the eviction order: our inability to guarantee that the deed [massacre] of Deir Yassin will not recur here as well. The property was handed over to the committee that handles enemy property.’

These laconic, stale reports veil an acute interpersonal and intercommunal drama. Oral recollections of those who were involved in the expulsion shed important light on the events of that fateful day, the likes of which happened in numerous other Palestinian villages. The immediate pretext for deportation was an incident in which Jewish workers were injured in the fields, an incident that caused intense panic in the village. Early in the morning, an armed Jewish delegation from Raʿanana, headed by security chief Moshe Schwartzman, entered Khirbat ʿAzzun. They found its inhabitants near the mosque ‘on their shackles, sitting on the ground and awaiting their fate’. It was a Friday, the day of Islam’s congregational prayer. After attempting to break into the mosque, the delegation engaged in a ‘nervous and impatient’ conversation with the village dignitaries regarding assuring the safety of the villagers and their property. The delegation ordered the residents to leave.

Sh. Elon, the local Haganah commander who was with the delegation and oversaw the eviction, testified that the Arabs entrusted him with the keys to their houses and property, to be kept until their return. Later on, the property was sold and the proceeds were deposited in a fund designed for compensating the Arabs once the fighting had ended. Instead, however, Raʿanana used the fund’s resources for building Beit ha-Magen, a monumental memorial hall commemorating the moshava’s members who fell fighting the Arabs.

Ra'anana was established south of Tabsur in 1921. Now a city, some of its suburbs have expanded into land that once belonged to the village. Batzra, founded in 1946 on village land, lies to the north.

In 1992, the Palestinian historian Walid Khalidi wrote: "The village has been completely covered with Israeli citrus orchards, making it difficult to distinguish from the surrounding lands. Citrus and cypress trees grow on the village land."

The estimated number of Palestinian refugees from Tabsur in 1998 was 2,406.

== See also ==
- Azzun
- Depopulated Palestinian locations in Israel

== Bibliography ==
- Barron, J. B., ed. (1923). Palestine: Report and General Abstracts of the Census of 1922. Government of Palestine.
- Conder, C.R.; Kitchener, H.H. (1882). The Survey of Western Palestine: Memoirs of the Topography, Orography, Hydrography, and Archaeology. Vol. 2. London: Committee of the Palestine Exploration Fund.
- Department of Statistics (1945). Village Statistics, April, 1945. Government of Palestine.
- Hadawi, S. (1970). Village Statistics of 1945: A Classification of Land and Area ownership in Palestine. Palestine Liberation Organization Research Center.
- Khalidi, W. (1992). All That Remains: The Palestinian Villages Occupied and Depopulated by Israel in 1948. Washington D.C.: Institute for Palestine Studies. ISBN 0-88728-224-5.
- Mills, E., ed. (1932). Census of Palestine 1931. Population of Villages, Towns and Administrative Areas. Jerusalem: Government of Palestine.
- Morris, B. (2004). The Birth of the Palestinian Refugee Problem Revisited. Cambridge University Press. ISBN 978-0-521-00967-6.
- Palmer, E.H. (1881). The Survey of Western Palestine: Arabic and English Name Lists Collected During the Survey by Lieutenants Conder and Kitchener, R. E. Transliterated and Explained by E.H. Palmer. Committee of the Palestine Exploration Fund.
