= Battle of Hareira and Sheria =

1917 battle of World War I

- Part of the Middle Eastern theatre of World War I
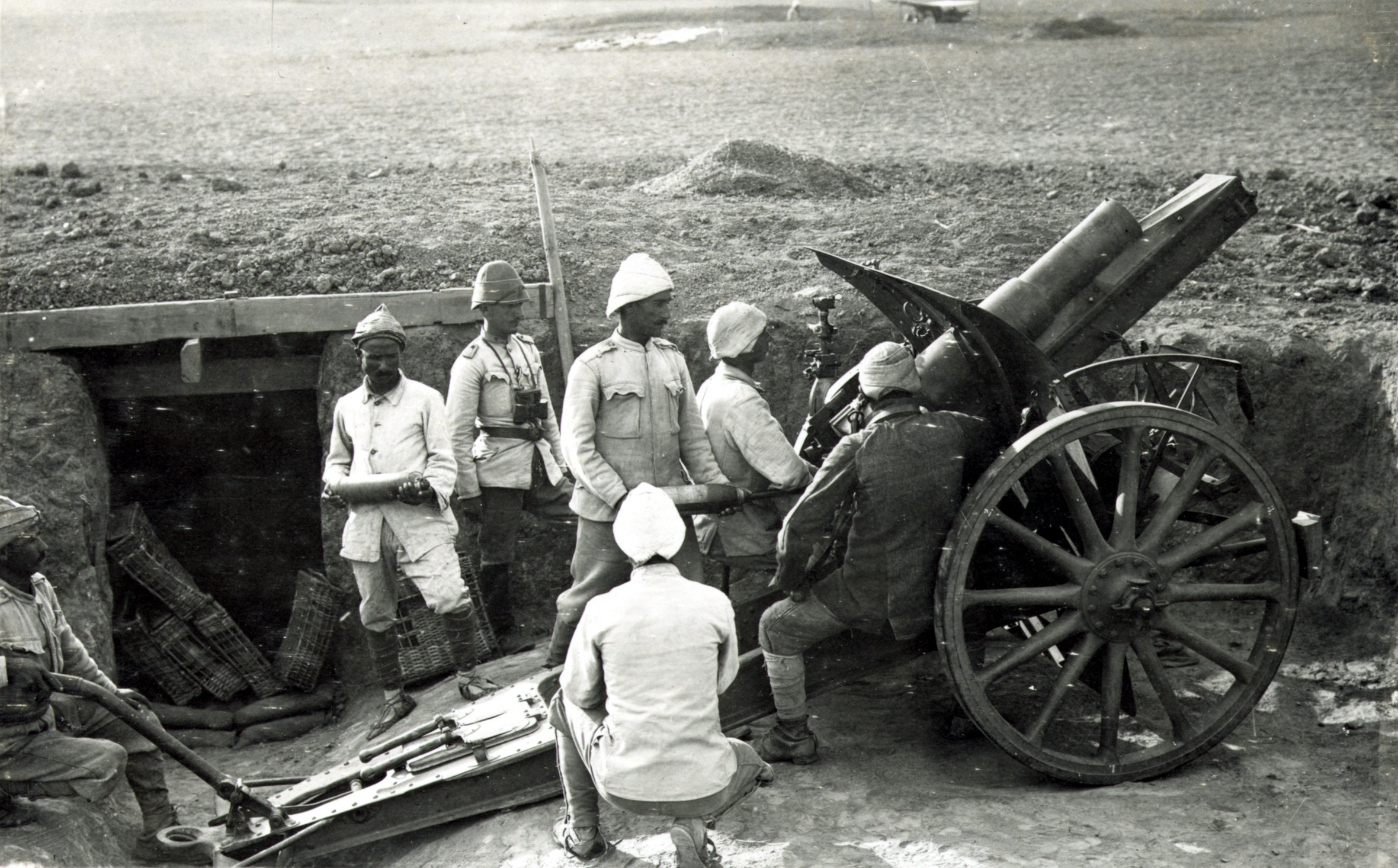
- Ottoman 10.5-centimetre (4.1 in) howitzer at Hareira
Date	6–7 November 1917
Location	the road and railway north-west of Beersheba, the Hareira and Tel el Sheria defences
Result	Egyptian Expeditionary Force victory

Belligerents
British Empire: United Kingdom; Australia; New Zealand; Sultanate of Egypt	Ottoman Empire; German Empire

Commanders and leaders
(United Kingdom) Edmund Allenby (Australia) Henry Chauvel (British Empire) Philip Chetwode	(German Empire) Erich von Falkenhayn (German Empire) Friedrich von Kressenstein (Ottoman Empire) Fevzi Pasha

Units involved
Egyptian Expeditionary Force: Desert Mounted Corps; Anzac Mounted Division Australian Mounted Division Yeomanry Mounted Division Imperial Camel Corps Brigade: XX Corps; 10th (Irish) Division 53rd (Welsh) Division 60th (2/2nd London) Division 74th (Yeomanry) Division	Yildirim Army Group: Seventh Army; Eighth Army; III Corps 19th and 27th Divisions; XX Corps (16th and 54th Infantry Divisions); XXII Corps 3rd, 7th and 53rd Infantry Divisions; 178th Infantry Regiment; German 701st, 702nd and 703rd Pasha Infantry Battalions; 3rd Cavalry Division

The Battle of Hareira and Sheria was fought on 6–7 November 1917 when the Egyptian Expeditionary Force attacked and captured the Yildirim Army Group's defensive systems protecting Hareira and Sheria in the centre of the Gaza to Beersheba line, during the Southern Palestine Offensive of the Sinai and Palestine Campaign in World War I.

These defensive systems, which had successfully repelled frontal attacks during the Second Battle of Gaza, became vulnerable, after a six months' stalemate, to a flanking manoeuvre by the XX Corps on 6 November. This was made possible by the capture of Beersheba on 31 October after which Ottoman defenders had been pushed back north from the town into the Judean Hills, during the Battle of Tel el Khuweilfe. The 74th (Yeomanry) Division attacked the eastern end of the defences from the eastern flank, while the 60th (2/2nd London) Division attacked the Kauwukah and Rushdi defensive systems from the south-eastern flank.

The eastern end of the Ottoman defences was captured in a preliminary attack by the Yeomanry, which was followed by the main attack by the Londoners, supported by the 10th (Irish) Division on the left. The right flank of this attacking force was covered by the Yeomanry Mounted Division, while their left flank was covered by the Australian Mounted Division. The attacks by the three infantry divisions, supported by effective artillery barrages, resulted in the capture of the Kauwukah and Rushdi defences, after fierce fighting. Towards dusk the Londoners reformed in preparation for an attack on Sheria Station, and across the Wadi esh Sheria to the fortifications on Tel esh Sheria. The attack was progressing after sundown, when the Ottoman garrison destroyed a large ammunition dump near the station, lighting up the night sky. The Londoners attack across the wadi, having lost the benefit of darkness, was halted for the night. Although the Londoners captured a wadi and Tel esh Sheria, fierce fighting during a series of Ottoman counter-attacks on 7 November prevented the Londoners advancing.

The Australian Mounted Division was ordered to clear the way for the infantry, when the 4th Light Horse Brigade moved through the Londoners to charge the strongest Ottoman position. Although the light horsemen were ordered to dismount in the face of fierce fire, one troop which succeeded in gaining the redoubt were decimated in the process of dismounting to get their rifles off their backs. After being held through the day, late in the afternoon another attack by the 60th (London) and the Australian Mounted Divisions captured the Ottoman rearguard. This attack, along with the occupation of Gaza during the morning, broke the Ottoman line. Seven days later, as a consequence of the EEF victory at the Battle of Mughar Ridge, Jaffa was occupied and on 9 December 1917 after the Battle of Jerusalem, that city was occupied and a new EEF line established from Jaffa to Jerusalem.

== Background ==
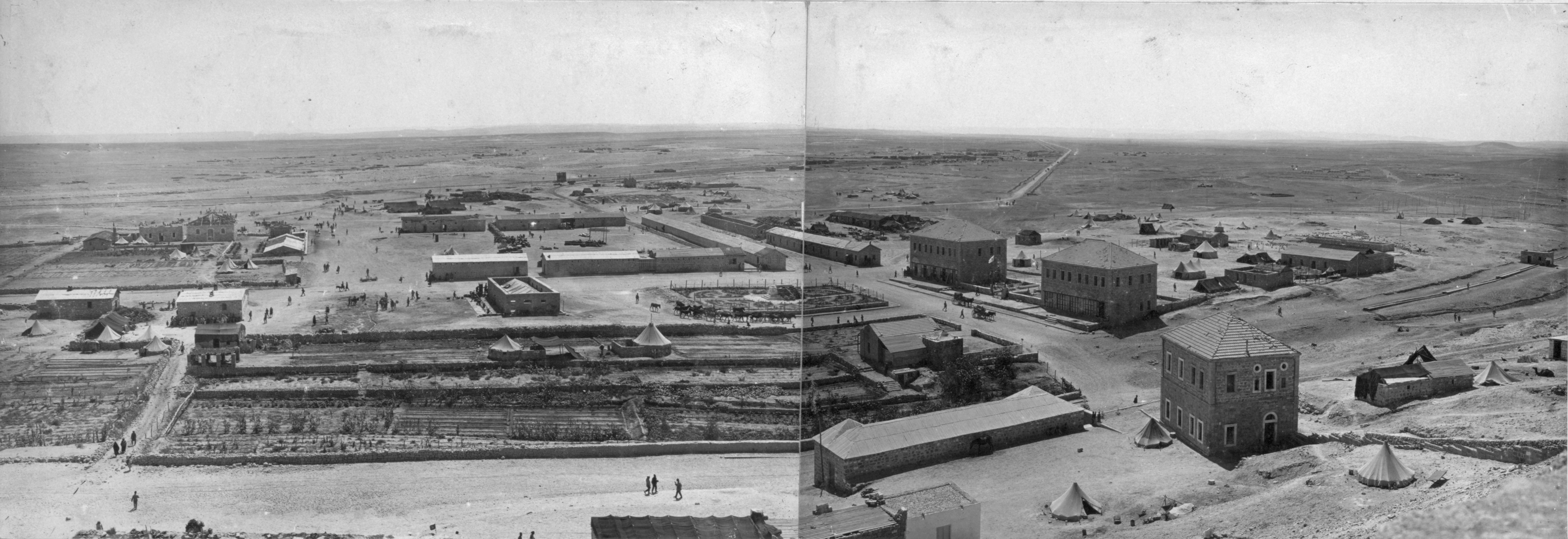
Ottoman military town of Hafir el Aujah, the Principal Desert Base relocated to Tel el Sheria

The Ottoman Army's main Desert Base at Hafir el Aujah was being reduced as a result of the victory at the Battle of Rafa in January 1917 which ended the Sinai campaign. By February Sheria, midway between Gaza and Beersheba on the railway line from Beersheba to Jerusalem and Jaffa, had become the main Ottoman base, and a major administrative and logistics centre. Here, a large proportion of the Ottoman defenders, were held in reserve. "Sheria was till June headquarters of the enemy force in the Gaza–Beersheba line. In consequence of the British air bombing it was moved in July to Huj." After the formation of the Seventh Army and Eighth Army headquarters, located at Huj and Hebron respectively, Sheria was not so strongly manned and relied on the Khawukah fortified defences to defend the place.

Here the Fourth Army established a central training facility staffed with German and Austrian instructors as well as experienced Ottoman officers from the European fronts of Galicia, Romania, and Macedonia. They routinely conducted courses on a regular basis in current tactics and weapons in use on the western front. In addition commanders received a 15-day course and divisional officers a six-week course focused on the use of machine guns, "which was vital to the newly reorganised Ottoman infantry battalions." Artillery training also included up to date methods and tactics. (Note: Guy Dawnay says Sheria's importance was due to its water. [Bruce 2002 p. 140])

Early in November, the commander of the Yildirim Army Group Erich von Falkenhayn was at Aleppo, but in "good telegraphic communications" with his Seventh and Eighth Armies in Palestine, his Sixth Army in Mesopotamia and with the Ottoman General Staff in Constantinople, on his way to Jerusalem at the beginning of his appointment. From Aleppo, von Falkenhayn ordered Fevzi's Seventh Army to "reassumed control of his original operational area, including all combat units, support units and line of communications troops north of Beersheba", and early on 1 November Fevzi ordered his army to establish a defensive line, while he also moved his headquarters to Hebron also known as al-Ḫalīl. He passed through Damascus on 4 November, to arrive at Jerusalem to begin establishing his headquarters in the German Hospice on the Mount of Olives, during the evening of 5 November.

Meanwhile, the main attack on Hareira and Sheria by the EEF was delayed for two days, by water and transport difficulties.

== Prelude ==
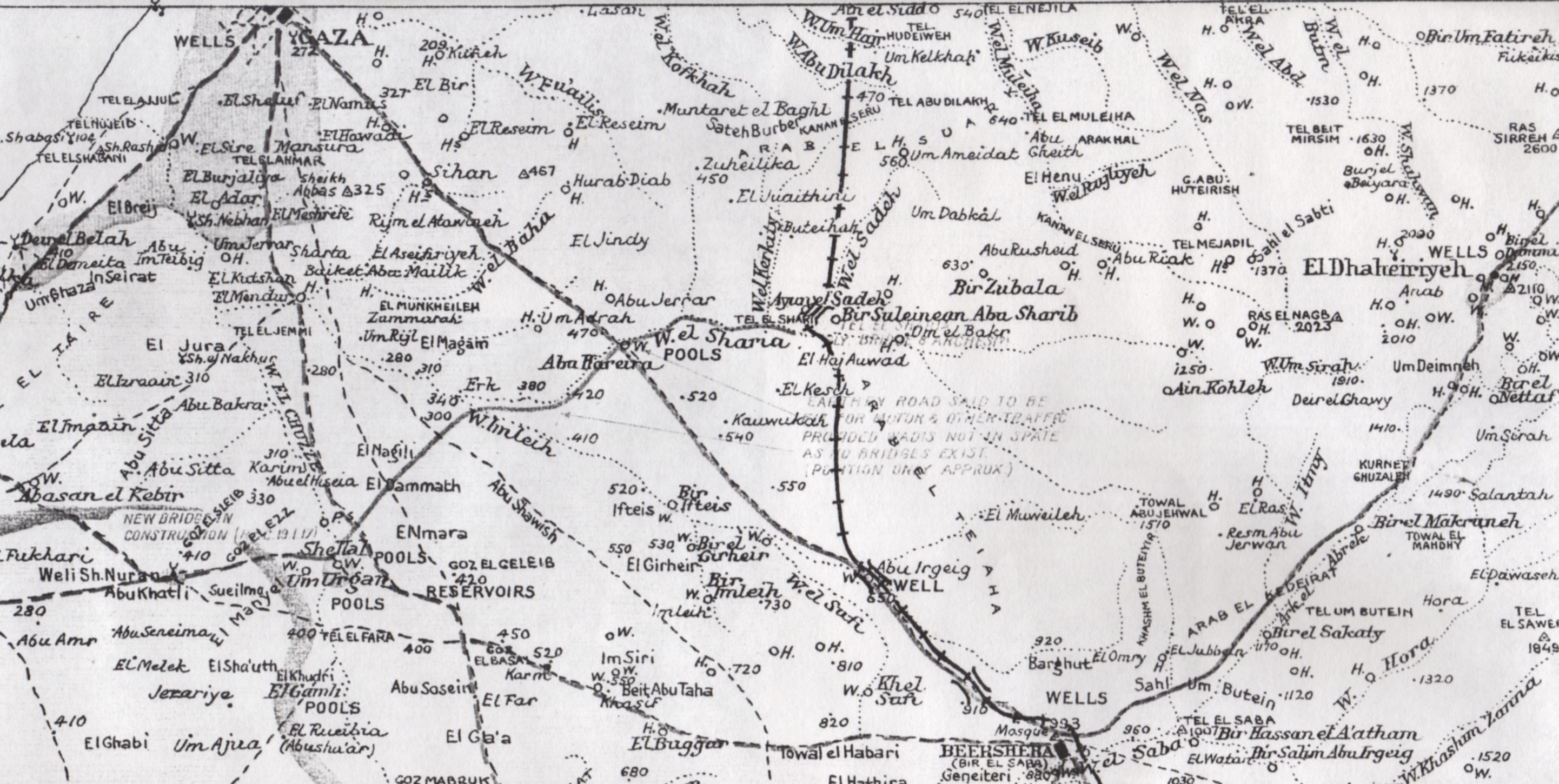
Detail of El Arish to Beersheba Map showing the Gaza to Beersheba line, Sheria and Edh Dhaleiriye

The capture of the Ottoman defensive line, which had been held and strengthened since before the Second Battle of Gaza, required multiple attacks, after the Battle of Beersheba on 31 October. Gaza on the coast remained in Ottoman hands, along with the Ottoman front line stretching from there to Hareira and Sheria in the centre. The line continued to the road to Hebron and Jerusalem, manned by the Ottoman Beersheba garrison which had withdrawn north into the Judean Hills, to defend Tel el Khuweilfe and the road to Jerusalem. The defensive line had been bent back not broken. (Note: Grainger suggests the "new defensive line in front of Tell esh–Sheria was scarcely strong enough to withstand an early assault." [Grainger 2006 p. 135])

Limited attacks were made on the strong Gaza defences by the XXI Corps on 1 November during the inconclusive Third Battle of Gaza, and towards the 2,500-foot-high (760 m) Tel el Khuweilfe and the road to Jerusalem, by the Desert Mounted Corps. These attacks at both ends of the Ottoman line were designed to keep the defenders from moving reinforcements to the centre. The 53rd (Welsh) Division (XX Corps) marched through Beersheba at 06:30 on 1 November, to occupy a line 3 miles (4.8 km) to the west of the town unopposed, placing them in a position to cover the right flank, of the proposed attacks by XX Corps on Hareria and Sheria. The Anzac Mounted Division on the right, extended the line eastwards to the Jerusalem road, where they met stiff opposition.

By the afternoon of 2 November 60th (London) Division headquarters and the 180th Brigade group had moved to bivouac about 1.5 miles (2.4 km) south-west of Beersheba, with the 179th and the 181st Brigade group following the next day, before the 180th Brigade moved on during 4 November to bivouac south of El Muweileh, while the 181st Brigade relieved the 230th Brigade (74th (Yeomanry) Division). The capture of the Ottoman line after the victory at the Beersheba, required the capture of Hareira and Sheria, to create a gap sufficiently wide for the Desert Mounted Corps to advance north to Nejile and north-east to Huj, into the Ottoman rear to cut the enemy's lines of retreat. From 1 November the attacks by the Anzac Mounted and the 53rd (Welsh) Divisions and the days and nights of fighting, "played a vital part in the success of the subsequent operations, by engaging the enemy's principal reserves and defeating his counterstroke", while the concentration for the main attack on Sheria went ahead without interference. Although this fierce fighting for control of the high country north of Beersheba resulted in a drawn battle, Desert Mounted Corps was able to advance to gain a "position of vantage from which to roll up the enemy's flank."

=== Defenders ===
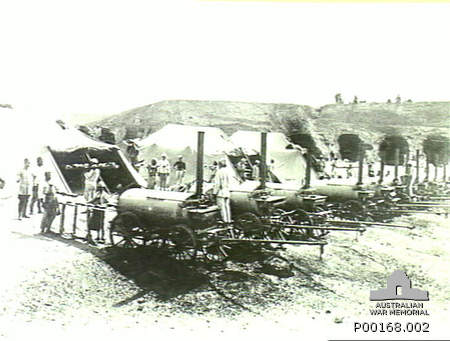
Ottoman bakery at Sheria

At the end of October, the estimated strength of the Yildirim Army Group holding the Gaza to Sheria line, was 40,000 rifles, which was later revised to 33,000 rifles, 1,400 sabres, and 260 guns. Tel el Sheria was defended by three Ottoman divisions of about 10,000 infantry in the Ottoman XX Corps. Part of the 26th Division defended the Hareria and Wadi esh Sheria area, while the 16th Division defended Tel el Sheria. The 26th Division linked the 16th Division with the 19th Division and III Corps headquarters at Edh Dhahriye on the road to Jerusalem. Only with one officer and 27 men of the 26th Regiment (27th Division), which had formed part of the Beersheba garrison arrived to defend Tel esh Sheria.

The 8 miles (13 km) of trenches known as the Kauwukah (also known as Qawuqa) and the Rushdi Systems, stretched east from the Wadi esh Sheria at Hareira, on either side of the Beersheba railway and the Wadi esh Sheria 2 miles (3.2 km) to the north. These defensive systems had been dug across an arid, dusty plain, devoid of cover except for the wadis, to the foot of the Judean Hills. They were defended by the 16th Division which deployed two regiments in the firing line. (Note: During the Second Battle of Gaza on 19 April, the 16th Division had been deployed in the same area, at Tel esh Sheria and Hareira. [Falls 1930 Vol. 1 p. 349]) On the western side of the railway there was a continuous trench strengthened by an almost continuous second line of trenches connected to the first by many communication trenches. These fortifications were in the shape of a half moon facing south-east, south and south-west. On the eastern side of the railway the fortifications consisted of a series of strong points some as much as 400 yards (370 m) apart facing south. All the fortifications were well sited and constructed although the wire strengthening the defences west of the railway was not thick or continuous and there was no wire protecting the defences to the east of the railway. (Note: Bruce gives a slightly different description of the Kauwukah and Rushdi defences. [Bruce 2002 pp. 138–9])

Any EEF infantry or mounted attack on Sheria or attempted breakthrough northwards would be stopped by enfilade fire from a string of mutually supporting smaller works east of the railway line from Beersheba, 5–6 miles (8–9.7 km) south-east of Hareira. The western side of the railway line was defended by the Kauwukah system, which was in turn linked by a strong line of trenches with the Rushdi system covering Hareira, straddling the Gaza to Beersheba road, and extended towards Hareira and the Wadi esh Sheria. Here the strong Hareira redoubt extended the line from the other side of the Wadi, to the Mustapha trenches which re-crossed the Gaza to Beersheba road. A light railway ran back to ammunition dumps south of Sheria from the Rushdi system. This strong Ottoman front line stretched across ideal country for defence. The trenches were deep and well concealed, providing excellent cover, and dominating the gently undulating, very open and bare landscape to the south. Between each successive trench line, there was absolutely no cover for attacking infantry, forced to advance over the stony ground.

Aeroplane photos showed that the Rushdi and Kauwukah trenches were deep, well sited, and even more elaborate than was the case at Beersheba. They consisted of a fire trench, a control trench roughly parallel to it, and numerous communication trenches. Machine-gun positions seemed to be everywhere, and the flank was covered by series of detached positions on the hilltops to the east, finishing away in the very difficult terrain in the neighbourhood of the Beersheba–Hebron road.

— London Scottish Regimental Gazette July 1918

However, when he arrived at Jerusalem during the evening of 5 November von Falkenhayn ordered Kress von Kressenstein, to withdraw the Eighth Army's heavy guns at Gaza and east of the town, back to the north of the Wadi Hesi some being transported on the railway.

==== Zuheilika Group ====
The Seventh and Eighth Armies' reserve force known as the Zuheilika Group, commanded by Colonel Ali Fuad, was formed by withdrawing part of the Ottoman 26th Division at Khirbet Sihan and at the Hareria defences, during the night of 4/5 November. About 1,000 soldiers moved back from between Kh. Sihan and Hareira to Khirbet Zuheilika 5 miles (8 km) north-north-east of Hareira. They concentrated in a central position at Khirbet Zuheilika, so as to be able to reinforce seriously threatened parts of the Ottoman defences. By the evening of 6 November they were defending the Wadi esh Sheria during the 60th (London) Division's attack.

=== Attackers ===
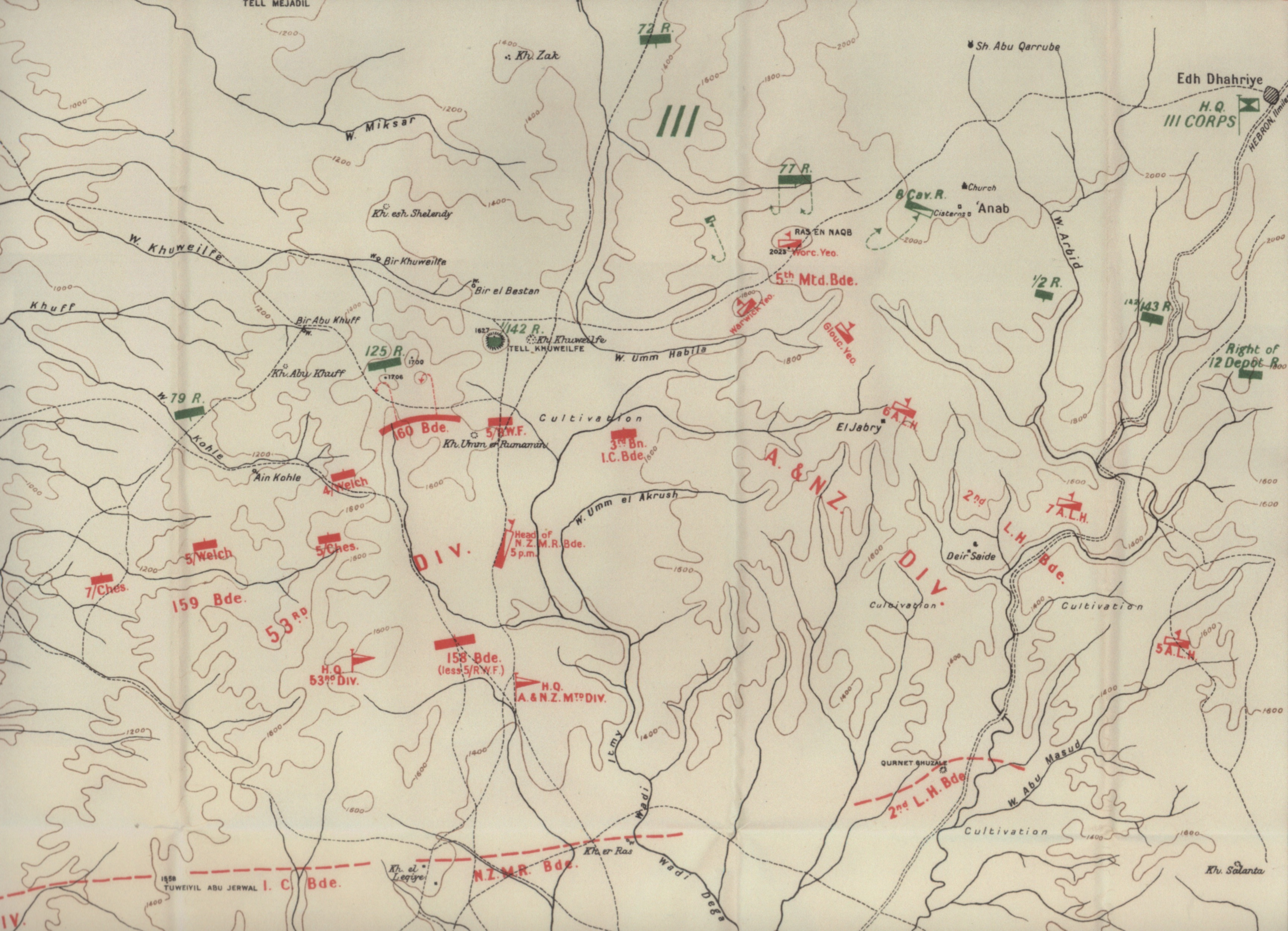
EEF line established on 1 November and fighting north of Beersheba on 4 November

The EEF's XX Corps (less the 53rd (Welsh) Division and the Imperial Camel Corps Brigade temporarily attached to Desert Mounted Corps) was to attack the Kauwukah system of trenches in the centre of the Gaza to Beersheba line. Allenby concentrated four divisions of 40,000 infantry for the main flank attack, south of Tel esh Sheria. At dawn on 6 November the 74th (Yeomanry) Division was deployed close up to the defences east of the railway on the right, the 60th (London) Division in the centre north of Bir Abu Irqaiyiq, and the 10th (Irish) Division on the left. These three infantry divisions were supported by the XX Corps heavy artillery, the 15th and the 181st Heavy Batteries, as well as the 378th, the 383rd and the 440th Siege Batteries with the Australian Mounted Division on their left and the Yeomanry Mounted Division on their right connecting with the 53rd (Welsh) Division.

The XX Corps was concentrated to the east and the south-east of the Hareira defences, ready to attack in a north-westerly direction. Once the 74th (Yeomanry) Division had captured the defences east of the railway and the railway, the 60th (London) Division was to attack and capture the Kauwukah trenches, before moving on to capture Sheria. In preparation for these attacks on 6 November, careful reconnaissance was made of the Kauwukah system, including all possible lines of deployment, routes and gun positions. During the night of 5/6 November the divisions concentrated for the attack.

==== EEF preparations for the attack ====
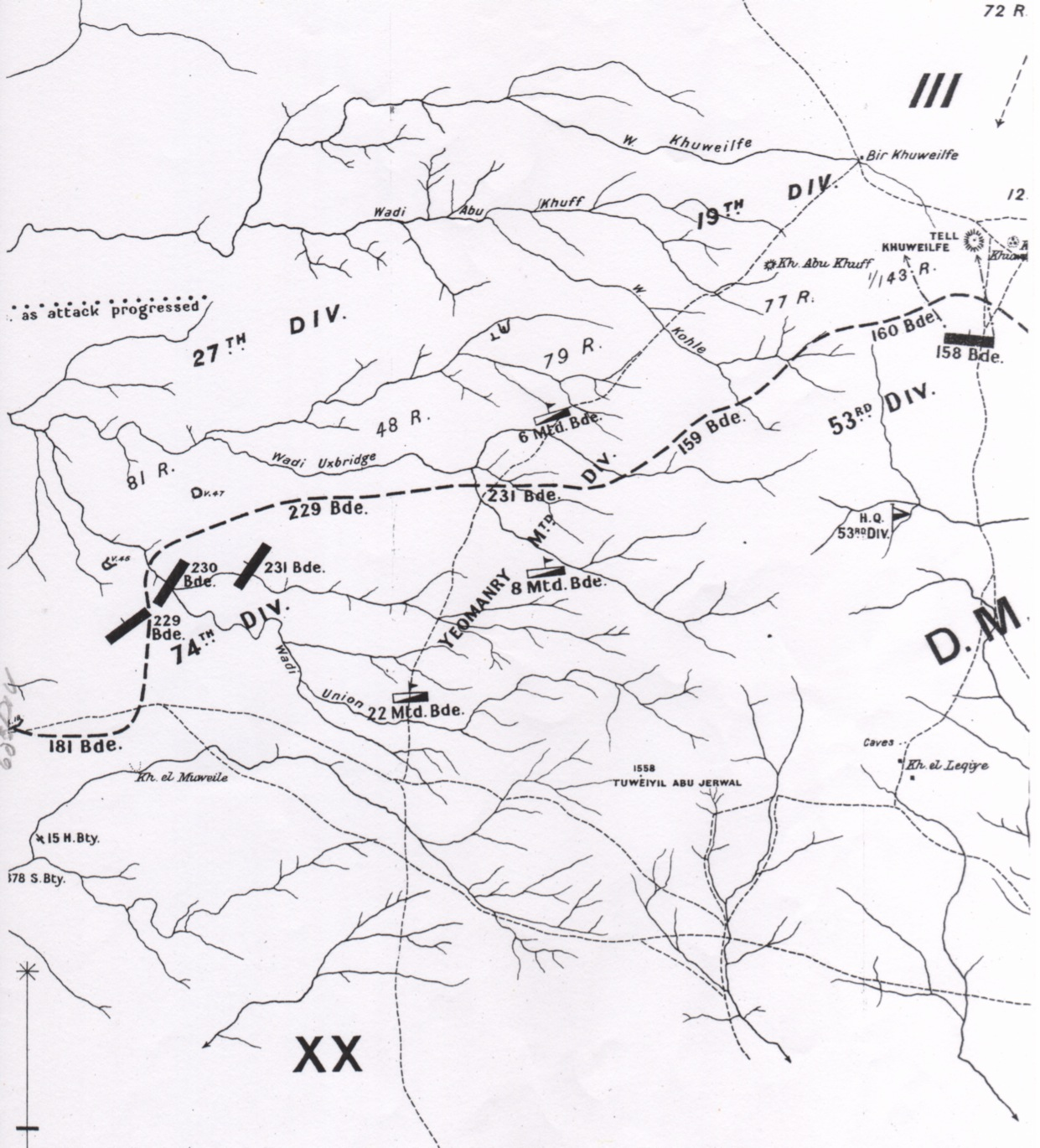
Falls Map 8 deployments in the Tel el Khuweilfe area before the attack on 6 November

During the morning of 3 November Allenby ordered the XX and the Desert Mounted Corps to prepare for an attack to be launched against the Ottoman defences on 4 November when Sheria and Nejil would be the objectives. He reported to the War Office: "To-day has been a day of dust and haze, driven by a strong and hot south wind; and reconnaissance has been difficult. I don't really know what the Turks are doing on either flank; but they appear to be moving troops about, freely, in the back areas. My officers and men are fit and very confident ... Keep me up to strength of my present establishment; and we shall get on all right, I hope. Although he wanted this attack launched as soon as possible, in order to exploit the capture of Beersheba, it was postponed after a conference of all divisional commanders, on 4 November at Beersheba. Chetwode telegraphed him at 10:15 to say, 'General Chauvel and myself, after closest consultation, have decided with great reluctance that, owing to water difficulties and thirst of men, postponement till 6th November is inevitable.'" Allenby subsequently drove to Beersheba, to confer with Chauvel and Chetwode, when he agreed to the postponement.

All bustle and hustle with the Military. Natives rounded up with their donkeys and camels, all bedraggled (their usual appearance). Camels unshaved and carrying stone jars of water in slings. Military Police on horseback at work on the populace. Red Cross cars parked after their activity with the human scraps. Armoured cars cleaning their guns. Transport dashing about over the heaps and mounds of fodder. Camels with fanaties, aeroplanes flying low over the place. Wrecked pumping station at work ... Cavalry details passing and repassing.

— Private Doug H. Calcutt, 2/16th London Regiment, 179th Brigade, 60th Division Diary 3 November 1917

The EEF force temporarily based at Beersheba after its capture required 400,000 gallons of water a day, and although water was developed wherever possible, water convoys brought water to the troops. Insufficient water and food for the men and horses became the main problems between 2 and 5 November. During this time fighting was continuing in the Tel el Khuweilfe area, while their horses had to be brought 28 miles (45 km) back to Beersheba to water. Further the troops concentrating for the attacks on Hareira and Sheria, which were deployed in a barren desert area "quite unsuitable for mounted work", required an additional day's supply for each man, and sufficient for every animal to have "drunk its fill", before this force could march out to battle. It was not until 6 November that the water supply was sufficiently improved.

A London Regiment private with the 60th (London) Division, "[s]pend[s] a day of thirst, [in] [t]he most depressing country conceivable ... not unlike the downs round Winchester but unrelieved dust colour, not a speck of green or a sign of habitation. Perfectly barren. Up hill and down dale and across Waddies we go. Clouds of dust inconceivable. So dense that you instinctively close on the man in front of you in order not to lose sight of him. Could not see your own feet, or where you were putting them down. That was the worst ... a man was just discernible at ten paces by peering. In the dust go camels, pack mules, limbers, wagons, artillery, and all the rattling paraphernalia of War."

After the conference Chauvel ordered the Australian Mounted Division to ride back to Karm in the afternoon to ease the water at Beersheba. The division's horses had had their last proper drink at Khalasa on 30 October, as the water supply at Asluj and Beersheba had been restricted. (Note: It has been suggested this move demonstrated "how narrow was the margin of victory at Beersheba." [Gullett 1941 pp. 412–3]) As all the tents had been pulled down the previous day in preparation for a move, the 4th Light Horse Field Ambulance did dressings outside during the morning. Orders were received a noon and after lunch the field ambulance, along with the rest of their brigade rode out at 14:00 back to Karm where they arrived at 22:00. It was a "terrible ride in the dust ... 15 miles (24 km) direct through Beersheba and Buggar. The dust was so thick you could just make out the camel ahead and follow on. We lost the Brigade and camped for the night at Karm." The Australian Mounted Divisional Train (less the 5th Mounted Brigade's 38 Coy but with 7th Mounted Brigade Train), reached Karm at 23:00 after leaving Beersheba at 16:00.

The line of observation connecting the XX and the XXI Corps was taken over on 5 November, by the Australian Mounted Division with the 7th Mounted Brigade attached instead of the 5th Mounted Brigade. They relieved the Yeomanry Mounted Division which moved back to water at Beersheba. During the morning when they witnessed the buildup to the main attack, "[t]ransport and supplies galore, all going forward." The 11th and 12th Light Horse Regiments (4th Light Horse Brigade) relieved the 22nd Mounted Brigade on the Wadi Hanafish line at 06:30 on 5 November, while the 4th Light Horse Regiment remained in reserve until 16:00 when they extended the line to link with the 10th (Irish) Division. An hour later one troop of the 4th Light Horse Regiment, was guarding the junction of the Wadis Semara and Imleih, to protect the 10th (Irish) Division's artillery. Meanwhile, the horses were sent to water at the Wadi Fara from 09:00 to 17:30, one man to four horses with one feed for man and horse.

Despite the delay of six days from the capture of Beersheba, "the attack was now about to be carried out in the most favourable circumstances." At least seven Ottoman infantry regiments including the 19th Division, defended the area north of Beersheba along the Hebron road and at Tel el Khuweilfe, leaving only two regiments holding the 6.5-mile (10.5 km) line, up the Wadi esh Sheria. (Note: It has been claimed that the delay caused by lack of water and transport difficulties, "certainly gave our men a rest, [but] was of inestimable value to the Turk, enabling him to move his troops as he desired." [Dalbiac 1927 p. 125]) The main ammunition dump had been established north-west of Beersheba, with a smaller dump of about 7,000 rounds of 18-pounder, 1,500 rounds of 4.5-inch howitzer shells and a million and a quarter rounds of small arms ammunition, established by the 74th Divisional Ammunition Column near Muweile, in addition to ammunition carried by the batteries.

==== Plan of attack ====
The original plans for the EEF's capture of the Gaza to Beersheba line in October had included an attack on the Atawineh Redoubt by the Composite Force. This force of almost a division, consisting of the 25th Indian Infantry Brigade, a West Indian battalion, the French Détachement français de Palestine and the Italian Distaccamento italiano di Palestina, was camped east of the 75th Division in the region of Sheikh Abbas. Although this attack did not eventuate the force remained in the reserve.

The once-formidable Gaza–Beersheba line was now becoming vulnerable, and at dawn on 6 November three divisions of Chetwode's XX Corps were to attack the centre of the Ottoman defensive line, on a broad front. The XX Corps plan proposed the 60th (London) and the 74th (Yeomanry) Divisions capture the Sheria redoubt on 6 November, and after the 10th (Irish) Division capture Hareira on 7 November the 74th (Yeomanry) Division would form corps reserve, while the 60th (London) Division was attached to the Desert Mounted Corps. The 53rd (Welsh) Division was to continue their attacks in the Khuweilfe area.

The XX Corps first objectives were 8 miles (13 km) of trenches known as the Kawuqa System which stretched east from the Wadi esh Sheria at Hareira, on either side of the Beersheba railway and the Wadi Sheria 2 miles (3.2 km) to the north. With their approaches devoid of cover except for the wadis, these trenches, dug across an arid, dusty plain to the foot of the hills, were held by the 16th Division, with two regiments in the firing line. (Note: During the Second Battle of Gaza on 19 April, the 16th Division had been deployed in the same area, at Tel esh Sheria and Hareira. [Falls Vol. 1 p. 349])

On the western side of the railway, the continuous trench line was strengthened by an almost continuous second line of trenches, connected to the first line by many communication trenches. These fortifications were in the shape of a half moon facing south-east, south and south-west. On the eastern side of the railway the fortifications were not quite so strong, consisting of a series of strong points some as much as 400 yards (370 m) apart, facing south. All the fortifications were well sited and well constructed, although the wire strengthening the defences west of the railway was not thick or continuous, and the defences to the east of the railway had no wire protection.

These Ottoman defences had proved their strength against frontal attack, during the Second Battle of Gaza. They were not to be attacked frontally, but from the flank. However, in order to have sufficient space to get into position for a flank attack and to enfilade the Ottoman line, it was necessary for the 53rd (Welsh) Division to push back the Ottoman forces and occupy the Khuweilfe to Rujm edh Dhib line to the north of the Wadi Khuweilfe and 5 miles (8 km) west-north-west of Tell Khuweilfe. However, the divisional commander argued for an attack on the Khuweilfe position without "seeking to press forward on his left."

Without room to get into position for the three divisions of the XX Corps to make flank attacks, the plan was for the 74th (Yeomanry) Division on the right to make a flank attack on the defences east of the railway before advancing to cover the right of the 60th (London) Division, during their frontal attack on the Kauwukah system towards the high ground north of Tel esh Sheria. The frontal attack by 60th (London) Division would be made by the 180th Brigade on the right and the 179th Brigade on the left each supported by an artillery group, with the 181st Brigade in divisional reserve. One brigade of the 10th (Irish) Division covered the left flank of the 179th Brigade. Then the 60th (London) Division with a brigade of the 10th (Irish) Division was to cross the railway and capture 2 miles (3.2 km) of the trench line to the west of the railway, while the remaining two brigades of the 10th (Irish) Division formed corps reserve.

== Battle ==
=== 6 November ===
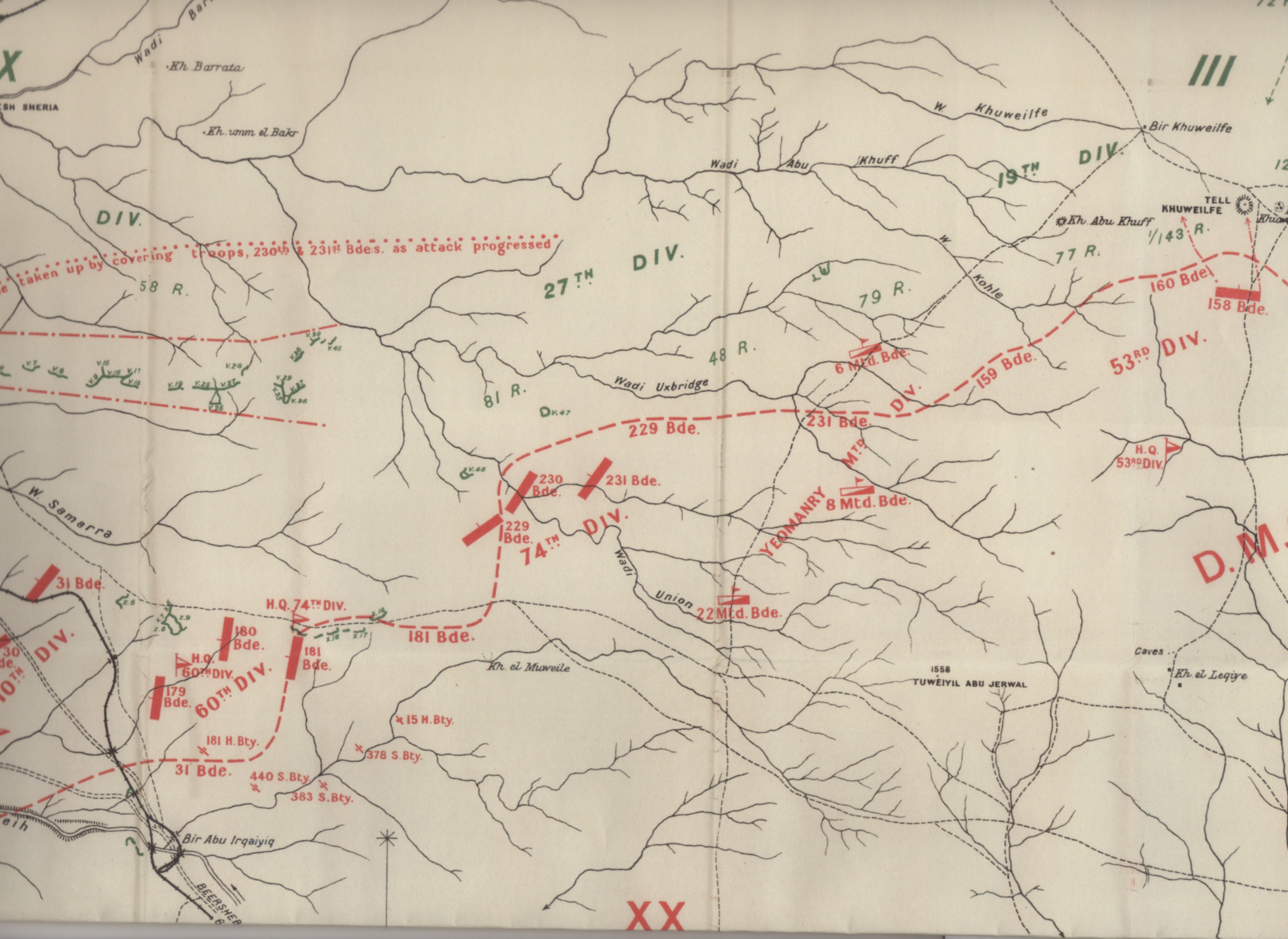
XX Corps attack on 6 November stretching from Tell Khuweilfe westwards towards Hareira

The attack of the XX Corps on the Hareira and Sheria defences was from the south-east towards the north-west, making it possible for the infantry to approach the Ottoman trenches, in enfilade. The Ottoman defences had been built to resist attack from the south. They had proved to be impenetrable from that direction during the Second Battle for Gaza. However, now the 74th (Yeomanry) Division was to launch the preliminary attack from the east, while the main attack by the 60th (London) Division was launched from the south-east.

==== Preliminary attack ====
After reaching their positions by 03:30, the 74th (Yeomanry) Division's attack on the Ottoman defences on the eastern side of the railway line, was launched by the 229th Brigade supported by the 44th and 117th Brigades Royal Field Artillery (RFA) on the left, and the 230th Brigade supported by the 268th Brigade RFA on the right rear, with the 231st Brigade echeloned behind on the right supported by the attached 10th Mountain Battery. (Note: Bruce describes that the division advanced across about 5 miles (8 km) of open country before coming into striking distance of the defences. [Bruce 2002 p. 139])

Suddenly, without warning a Very light illuminated the roadway, and the marching column, with dazzling brilliance, two hundred, three hundred, four hundred yards away to the right, that was all. To say the effect was startling is to put it mildly, we were practically in touch with the Turkish outposts. Proof that we were spotted, in the form of a tornado of bullets, which whistled all around, followed swiftly on the bursting of the light ... In a few moments we were screened from the road and in comparative safety.

— Lieutenant Robert H. Goodsall, Territorial Battery, Royal Field Artillery

The 74th (Yeomanry) Division's surprise attack was launched on about 6,000 yards (5,500 m) of single line trenches, dug to the east of the railway. Although they were well sited, they were not protected by wire entanglements. They attacked across burnt grass-land and cultivated country, broken by steep-sided wadies, without any preliminary artillery bombardment or barrage. The 16th Battalion Sussex, which began their assault at 04:00, captured their first objective an hour later. A bayonet charge by two detached platoons, subsequently captured a circular fortification beyond, which was much more strongly defended. After a "fierce struggle" during which 30 Ottoman soldiers were killed, the position and 70 prisoners were captured. Several unsuccessful attempts to counter-attack the 74th (Yeomanry) Division, were made by Ottoman forces on their left, which advanced out of Tel esh Sheria and others from the 27th Division, on their right. Nevertheless, the 74th (Yeomanry) Division advanced rapidly, with the 230th Brigade capturing three works by 06:00 and the 229th Brigade four more, soon after. Close support by the artillery now became possible.

... seeing they had got the direction correctly I returned to await the arrival of the battery. Very soon they came along ... and dropped into action as if on a "drill order." Firing orders had now come through, and in a remarkably short space of time we had got the right section ranging. The noise of incessant rifle fire just beyond the crest showed that our infantry were engaged. Glancing back I saw that the whole plain was alive with advancing units, the batteries of other brigades, the DAC [Divisional Artillery Column], ASC [Army Service Corps] columns, and camel convoys. Soon we were putting over a steady fire with gradually increasing range. Suddenly from behind came a frightful detonation and a cloud of smoke burst among the advancing column of the DAC, followed immediately by the sound of exploding shells from the wagons. A Turkish aeroplane had bombed the column. In quick succession the Turk dropped two more bombs at other masses of troops which lay below him.

— Lieutenant Robert H. Goodsall, Territorial Battery, Royal Field Artillery

On the front of the 231st Brigade the defenders made a "brave fight", until 07:00 when the position was captured by the 24th Battalion Welch (231st Brigade), but they continued to be counter-attacked during the day. Serious resistance was also met by the 229th Brigade, from the defenders protected by cactus hedges, and their objective was not captured until 08:30. The 16th Battalion Sussex Regiment attacked, supported by one Lewis gun and two rifle sections, when they captured three officers, 25 men and a battery, which had been firing on troops of the 229th Brigade. Later two strong counter-attacks were launched by the Ottoman force, during which the battery was nearly retaken, before guns of the 268th Brigade RFA decimated the Ottoman unit. After a short pause, the 229th Brigade moved westward again under enfilading artillery fire, when they were less strongly opposed. By about 13:15 the brigade had reached the railway which was their final objective, when another Ottoman field battery was captured in the act of "limbering up", harnessing animals to pull the gun carriages.

==== Kauwukah defences ====
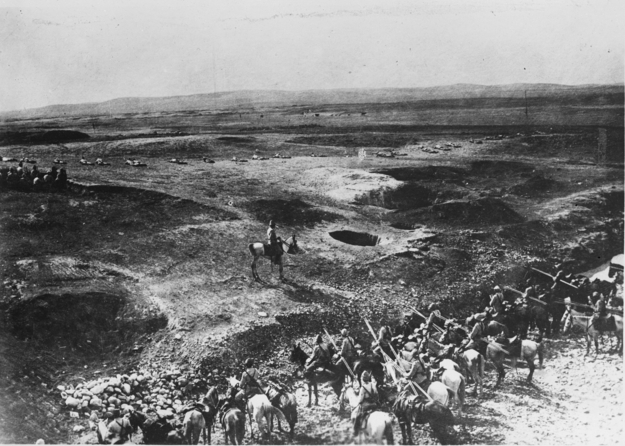
Ottoman lancers in foreground, infantry in the distance, with defensive ground works in the Hareira area

At 03:30 the attacking brigades of the 60th (London) Division moved forward to their positions.

There is a bombardment [going] on ... about two miles away. We are to march two [miles] but it seems a very doubtful two miles as it is dawn by the time we arrive. Hope the 1,000 yards (910 m) we have to do under machine gun and rifle fire bears a better resemblance to 1,000 yards than this march does to two miles.

— Private Doug H. Calcutt 2/16th London Regiment, 179th Brigade, 60th (London) Division

At 08:00, the 180th and the 179th Brigades (60th Division) with the one brigade of the 10th (Irish) Division on the left of the 179th Brigade, began to advance in conformity with the 74th (Yeomanry) Division's advances. The 74th (Yeomanry) Division made rapid progress while the 60th (London) Division moved forward in artillery formation. By 10:30 the artillery of the 10th (Irish) and the 60th (London) Divisions had arrived, and were in position to target enemy trenches. The guns continued wire cutting until 12:15, when the 18-pounder battery had cut two 10-yard (9 m) gaps, just east of the railway on the right bank of the Wadi Samarra. At the same time it was reported that the advanced troops of the 74th (Yeomanry) Division, had reached their final objective, the railway south of Sheria station.

The field artillery of the two divisions bombarded the trenches west of the railway, while the 96th Heavy Artillery Group moved forward, to target the double line of trenches near Kh. Kauwukah.

Unlimber and in position in a snap, but not before the shrapnel are bang, bang, bang in amongst them. Not the slightest heed did they [the Royal Horse Artillery] take. Carried on as if at drill. Unharnessed horses and take them back (one loose, wounded in the leg, quite calm the horses). I am still expecting them to seek a fresh spot, when they are barking back in their turn, and eventually the Turks guns cease to fire! Magnificent.

— Private Doug H. Calcutt 2/16th London Regiment, 179th Brigade, 60th Division

The attack by the 180th and 179th Brigades (60th Division) and the 31st Brigade (10th Division) on the Kauwukah and Rusdi systems of trenches, on the western side of the railway, began after the 74th (Yeomanry) Division captured the railway. Seeing a number of Ottoman soldiers retiring, Brigadier General Fitz J. M. Edwards (commanding 179th Brigade) ordered the attack to be launched at 13:35, before the 180th Brigade could get into position, so the 179th Brigade suffered heavy artillery and machine gun fire. The 2/18th and 2/19th Battalions, London Regiment (180th Brigade) and the 2/13th and 2/16th Battalions, London Regiment (179th Brigade) launched the attack, with one additional brigade in close support.

The 60th (London) Division commenced its frontal attack advancing in 'artillery formation,' with each platoon of "30 to 40 men marching in close order ... about 100 yards (91 m) from the other" platoons to maintain control of the men and limit the carnage. Deployed in this way, "one shell could wipe out only one platoon." When the assaulting London Regiment battalions of the 180th Brigade, the 2/18th and 2/19th with the 2/20th in close support and the 2/17th in reserve, "came under small arms fire the men got into extended order in a succession of waves, each man about 3 yards (2.7 m) from his neighbour", while the following waves were "at about 50-yard (46 m) distance." As the leading waves got "shot to pieces", the gaps they left were filled by the next wave of infantry. "For the final bayonet assault" the front line was "built up fairly densely."

Can see other platoons well in the smoke and dust ... Our artillery is barking and snapping in our ears all the time and shells screeching in both directions. We crouch down as near the ground as possible (our platoon commander quite serene). I shield my head with my water bottle. My telescope sight is on, but covered up. It is getting, together with my rifle, very dirty. Mind working on all sorts of things. With a boom, whiss, snap (which you never hear when it is for you) one is on us and Feakes is hit in the neck. Call for Stretcher Bearers, etc. etc. Machine guns and stokes and artillery and all going we crouch on knowing nothing of how things are going or what is over the hill "A" and "C" Companies are to attack in the first wave.

— Private Doug H. Calcutt 2/16th London Regiment, 179th Brigade, 60th Division

The attacking London Regiment battalions of the 179th Brigade, the 2/13th on the left and the 2/16th in the front line, advanced through a very heavy fire, to quickly capture their first objective. Subsequently, the 2/15th Battalion in support advanced through them closely followed by the 2/19th Battalion. In reserve were the 14th Battalion London Regiment (London Scottish) and the divisional pioneers, the 1/12th Battalion, Loyal North Lancashire Regiment.

Close above the infantry, the barrage by the EEF field guns and machine guns fired, creating an "unbearable", stunning, "cacophony." In front of the 179th Brigade, the "long downward slope" was peppered with bullets, "spurting up" the sand like "hailstones." Soon after the attack was launched, prostrate men littered the ground and "men were throwing up their arms and falling, headlong, some to lie still, others to writhe and scream in agony." They ran across the open ground until it rose toward the Ottoman trenches, which were "blanketed in a fog of smoke and dust."

We have ears for nothing else but the bullets and the machine guns. Our extension is 14 paces and we have to keep in line. This occupies our time. Whiss. Whiss. Whiss the bullets are flying past our heads. Shouts of "ease off to the left" "Ease off to the right" "Do not bunch" "Left shoulders up" and so on. A man is hit and the bullets are Zip Zip Zipping on the ground all around (no shells thank the Lord). The man is groaning. I am not excited, merely apprehensive. [After racing over a small ridge, Calcutt was ordered to shoot] Look through my sights, see only smoke and dust. Fire one round and decide to save the ammunition. Up and on again. Still unhit. Dash over. Very puffed and hide under shelter ...

— Private Doug H. Calcutt 2/16th London Regiment, 179th Brigade, 60th Division

The London Regiment battalions of the 180th Brigade (60th Division) on the right, the 2/18th and 2/19th pushed on rapidly over the undulating, open ground. Despite a heavy Ottoman barrage aimed at them, many survived because of their dispersed artillery formation. Along with two companies of the 2/20th Battalion in close support, they quickly drove the enemy out of their defences. D Company of that battalion found a gap on the right of the 2/18th Battalion to push on through and capture a strong post, when they killed or captured the whole of the Ottoman garrison. Meanwhile, the 2/18th Battalion captured two 77-mm guns and 60 prisoners and the 2/19th Battalion 20 prisoners. During the assault, the right battalion of the 180th Brigade, was covered by Lewis Gun fire from the 231st Brigade, 74th (Yeomanry) Division, which also denied the Ottoman forces the opportunity to withdraw their guns, from behind Kauwukah. The battalion of the 60th (London) Division which collected these guns, "forebore to claim the capture as theirs."

The 179th and 180th Brigades conducted steady advances until the leading troop were held up by fire, then building up to a strong firing line before launching an assault, while the field artillery lifted to the fortifications behind as the battalions captured the front trenches. A delay in the attack occurred, when the advancing infantry ran into uncut wire, and the 179th Brigade Stokes mortar barrage was called forward. "This is where we do our stuff. I told the fellows to set the gun up, but what was the range. How to even guess in that murk? God forbid that I should lob shells into our own men."

Calcutt with the 60th (London) Division describes what followed:

The barrage still bursting on the wire and trenches 50 yards (46 m) ahead. Dash over railway embankment led by Mr. Alexander, and halt in front of wire on account of barrage. High explosive and shrapnel throwing clouds of earth. Cries from the right of "Come on its only our barrage" (as if that made any difference.) Cries from the left "Wait till the barrage lifts." ... A minute or so after it lifted, and our Captain Bruce was first man through the wire. I made for his gap and we were soon in the trenches 8 feet (240 cm) deep and feeling quite secure. They proved to be a maze which we were ordered to scour, proceeding in various directions. I had the bayonet held out in front, loaded and finger on trigger. Dodged along, saw somebody. I started, he started, then we both smiled. It was Humphreys with [grenade] bomb with the pin out working in my direction. He seemed more anxious to get rid of the bomb than anything. Round and round this Hampton Court maze of 8 feet (240 cm) deep trenches we went ... We followed the maze till it finally sloped up and out. Company completely disorganized now. The Turks running off at the back as hard as they could ... everybody very excited and all talking at once. Our shells still banging away very near. Firing with rifles and machine guns on fleeing Turks. Prisoners coming in at the point of the bayonet.

— Private Doug H. Calcutt 2/16th London Regiment, 179th Brigade, 60th Division

By 14:00 the whole Kauwukah systems were captured. During the fighting the attackers suffered 1,300 casualties, while more than 600 prisoners were captured and 12 guns. Once the infantry were in place on the enemy's flank the superior numbers of the 60th (London) Division's attack made the outcome "inevitable." However, the "resolution" of the "determined" infantry attackers was "a big factor in the success."

On the left flank, the Australian Mounted Division based on Karm and Shellal, was deployed connecting the XX Corps with the XXI Corps at Gaza. At 17:45, the 4th Light Horse Brigade reported Ottoman soldiers appeared to be retiring from a redoubt near Kh. Khauwkah to the north of the Samarra bridge, which was being shelled by the 10th (Irish) Division. While two regiments 4th Light Horse Brigade continued to hold the line, at 08:30 one regiment conducted a reconnaissance towards Hareira and El Magam which reported at 12:55, being stopped by heavy gun and machine gun fire from esh Sheria, and that Ottoman units were holding the Wadi esh Sheria line from Kherk. During this reconnaissance, good crossings of the wadies Sheria and Imleih were found. At 13:00 the 12th Light Horse Regiment reported the infantry on the right front, appeared to be experiencing very little opposition as they advanced towards the Wadi esh Sheria, covered "the whole time" by a well-placed artillery barrage, in front of them. The infantry were still advancing two hours later.

==== Rushdi defences ====
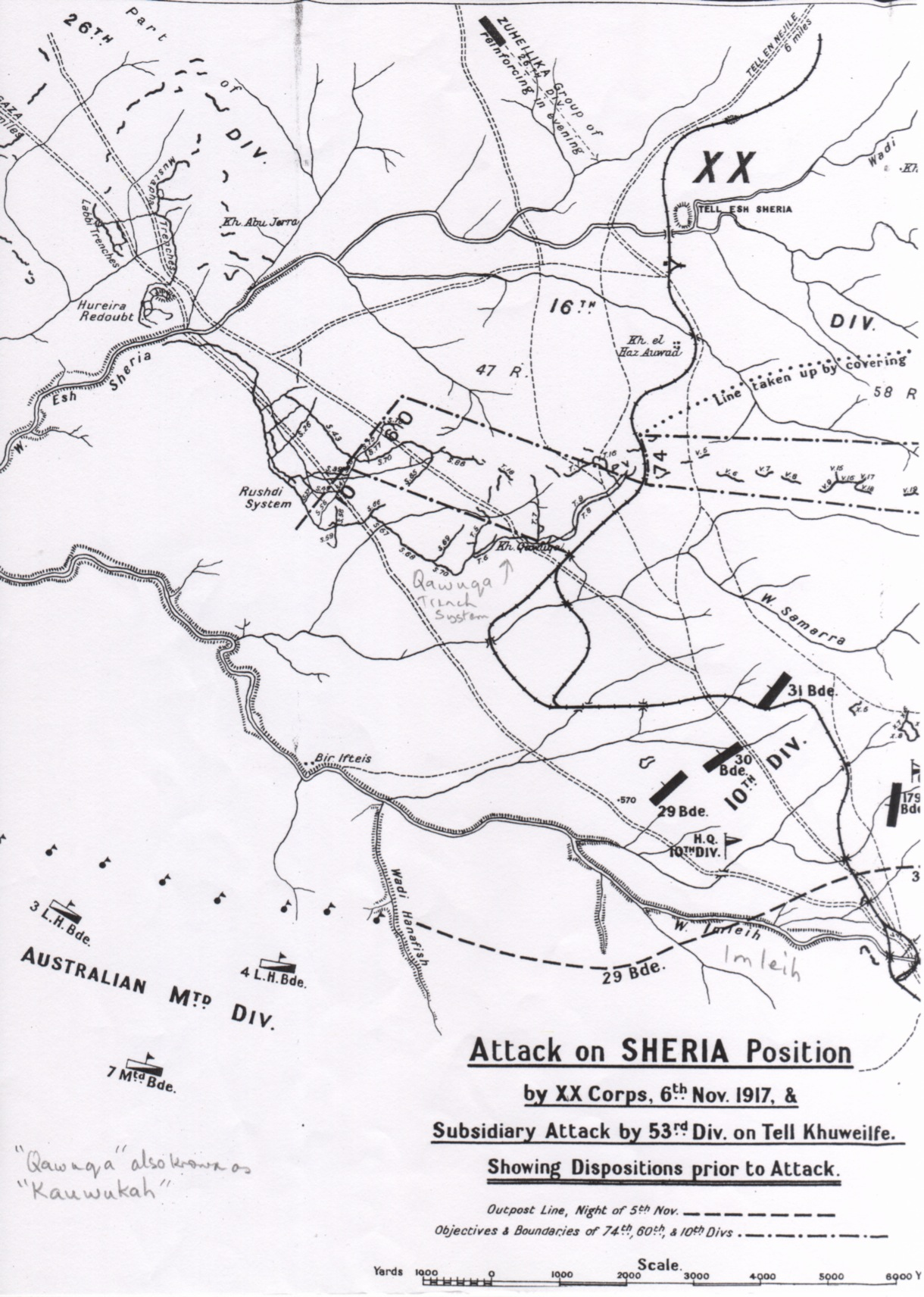
Attack on Hareira by XX Corps 6 November, deployment of 10th (Irish) Division

Patrols of the 179th Brigade, which were pushed forward towards the Rushdi defences, were only opposed occasionally by heavy machine-gun fire. In the rear of the attack by the 179th Brigade, the 31st Brigade (10th Division) went into action at 13:00, the 5th Battalion Royal Irish Fusiliers echeloned to the left rear of the 179th Brigade, with the 2nd Battalion Royal Irish Fusiliers slightly behind. With the advance of these further troops, the whole Rushdi position was quickly captured. The Irish battalions crossed the railway without casualty to easily capture their first objective. Following a brief fire fight their next objective was won, which placed them close to their final objective, which was captured by 14:30.

When the gun limbers and wagons came up from the wagon line we moved forward over the crest towards the captured Turkish trenches ... We came into action immediately below the crest and mid-way along the section of trenches which formed the Turkish line at this point. From the crest itself a magnificent view of the country to the north and west was obtained, the ground falling gently to the bed of the Wadi Sheria, some 4,000 yards (3,700 m) away. Prominent to the north-east lay Tel el Sheria.

— Lieutenant Robert H. Goodsall, Territorial Battery, Royal Field Artillery

The way was now clear for an advance to Sheria and its water supply. By this time, Ottoman forces were withdrawing from the Rushdi system back to the strong Hareira Redoubt, on the far side of the Wadi esh Sheria.

==== Sheria railway station ====
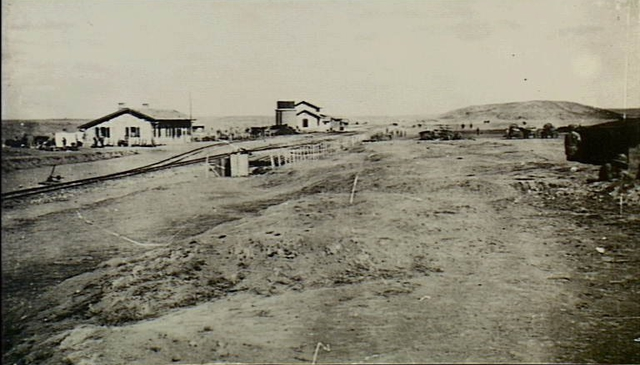
Sheria railway station captured on 6 November 1917

After the Kauwukah and Rushdi trench systems had been captured, the 60th (London) Division then turned north at 16:30, with orders to establish a strong bridgehead across the Wadi es Sheria, to the north of Sheria. They were to cover the water supply and occupy a line from Barrata to north of the railway. They marched north, towards the strong central point of the Ottoman line, to launch their attack. By 18:00, they were advancing with the 10th (Irish) Division on the railway east of Kh Kauwukah on their left, and the 74th (Yeomanry) Division on their right. The Yeomanry Mounted Division continued the line from the 74th (Yeomanry) Division to the 53rd (Welsh) Division, which had been trying to capture Tel el Khuweilfe during the day.

The 181st Brigade (60th Division) concentrated north of the Wadi Samarra while a company of the 2/20th Battalion, London Regiment (180th Brigade) advanced towards Sheria Station, to be by 17:00, within 500 yards (460 m) of the railway sidings. Here the 180th Brigade established outposts on the high ground on the northern slope of Kauwukah, overlooking Sheria railway station and water tanks, when the 181st Brigade began their advance in conjunction with the 180th Brigade towards Sheria. Each brigade was supported by its artillery group and the 74th Divisional artillery, which had been assigned to help cover the 60th (London) Division's attack, was ordered to support the advance.

It took some time for the Yeomanry artillery units to get into position, during which some artillery officers were separated from their fellow officers, and their units. "Having at last retrieved our missing officers we were once more in a position to go into action ... against a line of strong trenches, heavily wired, guarding the approach towards Tel el Sheria, the railway station and the Wadi Sheria."

Having previously found a gap in the defences, D Company, 2/20th Battalion, London Regiment (180th Brigade) pressed on without protection on either flank, capturing some prisoners and two machine guns before establishing themselves on a small hill some 500 yards (460 m) south-east of Sheria station. From this vantage they reported at about 17:00 that Sheria was strongly held, that an attack should be launched quickly, before Ottoman reinforcements could arrive. The 2/20th and 2/17th Battalions, London Regiment were ordered to capture Tel es Sheria and establish a bridgehead covering the railway viaduct. This advance was met by very heavy machine-gun fire. The 2/20th Battalion, London Regiment (180th Brigade) had reached a position close to the Sheria railway station, when reinforcements advanced to assault Sheria, but their approach was stopped by machine-gun fire from the Zuheilika group, which had just arrived.

The 60th (London) Division captured Sheria railway station at 17:50, but was stopped by strong Ottoman defences from crossing the Wadi esh Sheria to capture the mound/redoubt of Tel esh Sheria that night. (Note: By dusk all the objectives had been captured except the Sheria redoubt. [Keogh 1955 p. 160])

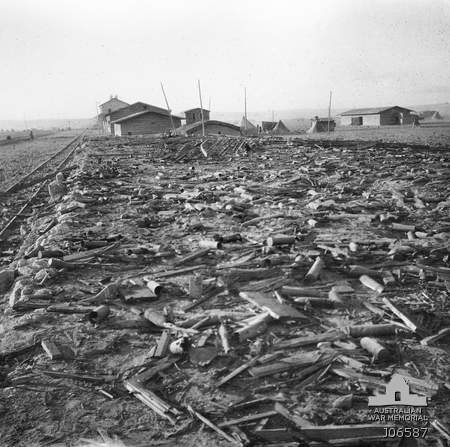
Destroyed Ottoman ammunition dump beside Sheria railway station

Sheria railway station was captured towards evening and the wadi crossing dominated by the huge mound of Tel el Sheria was to be attacked under cover of darkness. Soon after 19:00 two and a half companies of the 2/20th Battalion, London Regiment were advancing against "fierce rifle and machine-gun fire", when an ammunition dump, just south of Sheria station exploded, lighting up the whole area and exposing the advancing force. Caught in the open the attacking force held their ground, establishing outposts and sending out patrols to find crossings of the Wadi esh Sheria, but these "met with heavy machine-gun fire."

Before evacuating Sheria Station the Ottoman soldiers set fire to a "great depot of stores and munitions," creating a "series of terrific explosions." The "glare of the flames so exposed the line of advance across the wadi," making the attacking infantry "ideal targets" for the well-hidden Ottoman machine guns of the garrison on the hill. After a reconnaissance by moonlight, the crossing of the Wadi esh Sheria by the 60th (London) Division was postponed until 03:30 in the morning of 7 November.

We've had a successful day. We attacked the left of the Turkish positions, from N. of Beersheba, and have rolled them up as far as Sharia. The Turks fought well but have been badly defeated. Now, at 6 p.m., I am sending out orders to press in pursuit tomorrow. Gaza was not attacked; but I should not be surprised if this affected seriously her defenders. I am putting a lot of shell into them, and the Navy are still pounding them effectively. There was a very wet mist, this morning; which cleared at 8 o'clock. It was in our favour, as it veiled our start.

— Allenby letter to Lady Allenby 6 November

==== Deployment of Desert Mounted Corps on 6 November ====
The 3rd Light Horse Brigade continued holding the Hiseia area, the 4th Light Horse Brigade was still at the Wadi Hanafish, protecting the Karm and Shellal railways and linking the XX and the XXI Corps, while the 7th Mounted Brigade formed Australian Mounted Divisional reserve.

The 1st and 2nd Light Horse Brigades with the attached 5th Mounted Brigade to Anzac Mounted Division, moved back to Beersheba to get rations and to water their horses, while the New Zealand Mounted Rifles Brigade remained in position until relieved by the Imperial Camel Brigade. When the 2nd Light Horse Brigade had moved back to Beersheba to water during 6 November, they left one squadron of the 7th Light Horse Regiment and four troops 2nd Light Horse Machine Gun Squadron, to reinforce the Imperial Camel Brigade. The New Zealand Mounted Rifle Brigade came into local reserve, a few miles behind the front line, at Mikra. With their horses still at Beersheba they had marched out on foot at 17:00, the horses returning by 21:00. However, owing to the strength of the hostile attacks on the 53rd (Welsh) Division, they remained at Mikra in reserve.

At about 16:00 Desert Mounted Corps wired the EEF, informing them that the Anzac Mounted Division less the New Zealand Mounted Brigade and Field Squadron, would move immediately to take over the left of the Yeomanry Mounted Division line. After watering, the 2nd Light Horse Brigade moved out again "in great haste" to the Anzac Mounted Division's assembly point 5 miles (8 km) south-east of Sheria.

As soon as Allenby heard during the evening of 6 November, that the Qawuqa trench system defending Hareira had been captured, he anticipated the Wadi esh Sheria being crossed that night and issued orders for Chauvel, to ride through the broken centre of the Ottoman line to Jemmame and Huj. He returned the Australian Mounted Division from EEF GHQ reserve and ordered Barrow's force consisting of the 53rd (Welsh) Division, the Yeomanry Mounted Division, the New Zealand Mounted Rifles and Imperial Camel Brigades, part of the 2nd Australian Machine Gun Squadron and the light armoured car batteries, to hold their positions in the hills north of Beersheba.

=== Night of 6/7 November ===
During 6 November the EEF had advanced about 9 miles (14 km) capturing a "series of strong enemy works covering a front of some 7 miles (11 km)." Although the Wadi esh Sheria had not been crossed, only Tel esh Sheria and the main Hareira redoubts, remained in Ottoman hands overnight.

Falkenhayn commanding Yildirim Army Group, realized that the Ottoman forces could not hold the EEF much longer, and he ordered the Seventh and Eighth Armies to withdraw about 10 kilometres (6.2 mi), to prepare a fall-back line running from Wadi el Hesi to Huj to Zuheilika. During the night most of the Gaza garrison was evacuated. Meanwhile, in the Sheria area, the 16th Ottoman Division was reinforced by fresh troops from the Zuheilika Group. They were not more than 1,000 men, which advanced into Sheria, where the ammunition dump's explosions were lighting up the area.

During the night, reconnaissance of the Ottoman positions at Sheria was carried out by the 181st Brigade, with a view to crossing the wadi at two places to capture the high ground from Barrata to the railway. (Note: It has been claims that "the hill was stormed at 4.30 next morning and carried at the point of the bayonet."[Massey 1919 p. 40]) The commander of a machine-gun section of the 180th Machine Gun Company, described coming under heavy fire at about 04:00. "Walk across the open under shell, m.g. and rifle fire ... [the] battle of Machine Guns v. Machine Guns, depend[ing] entirely on the coolness of each individual gunner." Meanwhile, the 74th (Yeomanry) Division took up a position on the right of the 60th (London) Division, when their 230th Brigade (74th Division) was ordered not to advance across the Wadi esh Sheria nor extend their right to the Kh. Barrata, until touch with the 60th (London) Division could be established. They remained in position during the night.

The Australian Mounted Division was transferred from EEF general reserve to Desert Mounted Corps at 19:55 and fifteen minutes later orders were issued for all available mounted troops, except the Yeomanry Mounted Division, to be prepared for an advance to Jemmaneh and Huj. One division of the XX Corps was ordered a few minutes later to be prepared to follow Desert Mounted Corps towards Huj, while the remainder of the XX Corps occupied Hareira and Sheria, "covering and developing [the] water supply." During the night the Australian Mounted Division reached a concealed position 3 miles (4.8 km) west of Sheria in preparation for an expected breakthrough the following morning. Here the 5th Mounted Brigade rejoined the division while the 7th Mounted Brigade moved back into Desert Mounted Corps reserve. The 3rd Light Horse Brigade watered near Karm, before moving under orders of the Desert Mounted Corps from Shellal at 07:00 on 7 November via Imleih and Irgeig towards Sheria.

A detachment of Australian Mounted Divisional Train wagons, loaded with supplies at Karm for troops in the front line near Hareira, were handed over to troops in the firing line at midnight on 6/7 November. On 7 November the Australian Mounted Divisional Train again loaded their wagons at Karm before leaving at 16:00 to arrive at Beersheba at 04:00 on 8 November to distribute supplies.

==== EEF orders for 7 November ====
Chetwode issued orders during the night for the 10th (Irish) Division to capture the Hareira redoubt, and for the 60th (London) Division to transfer from the XX Corps to the Desert Mounted Corps. Chauvel ordered the 60th (London) Division to capture Tel el Sheria and then advance to Huj. He ordered the Anzac and Australian Mounted Divisions to begin their advance northwards to establish a line from Jemmameh and Huj, and he ordered Barrow commanding the Yeomanry Mounted Division, to take command of the force at Tel el Khuweilfe, including the 53rd (Welsh) Division. All arms were to advance strongly and decisively to capture as many of the Ottoman forces as possible.

=== 7 November ===
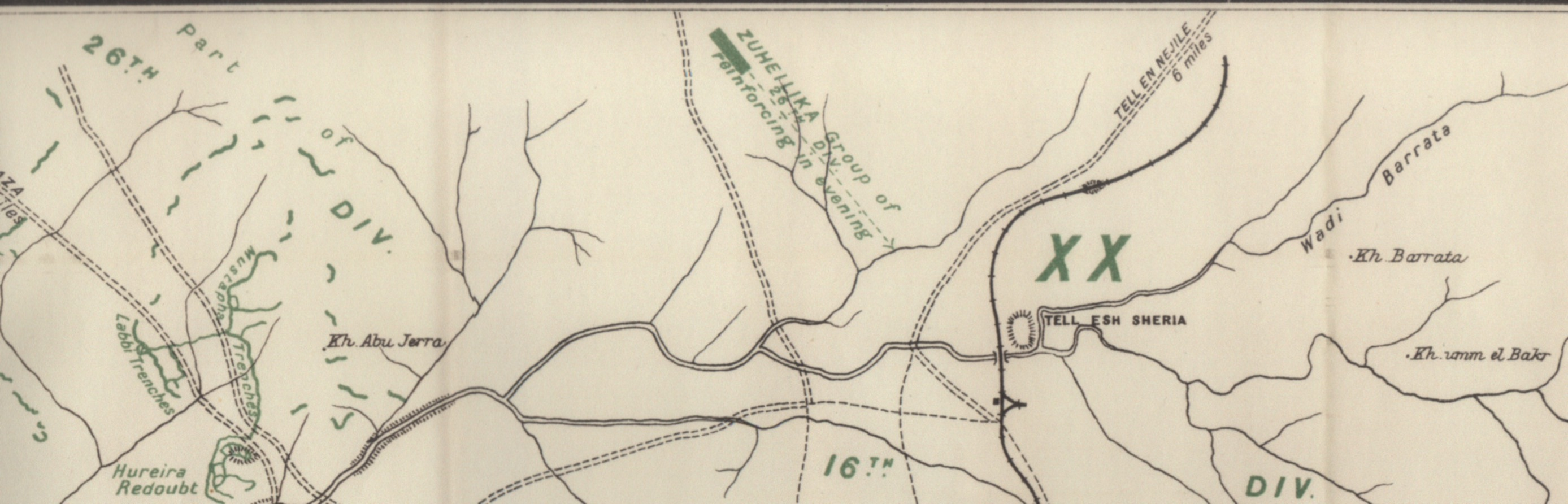
Detail of Falls Map 8 shows positions of Ottoman forces, Hareira redoubt and Tel esh Sheria, with the wadis esh Sheria, Barrata and Abu Khuff

During the night the Turks made preparations for their withdrawal, and towards morning their artillery fire ceased, showing that their guns were on the move. At dawn however, when the 60th Division attacked Tel el Sheria, their rearguards were still in sufficient force to offer a stubborn resistance. At 06,00 the hill fell and the whole of our line was able to advance some two and a half miles beyond the Wadi Sheria. From our elevated position we gained a most spectacular view of the fighting round Tel el Sheria. Through field glasses it was possible to watch the whole progress of the fight, the storming parties of infantry, mounted men dashing hither and thither, and the bursting shells above the hill. It was a day of stirring sights. As soon as the infantry had forced a gap through the retreating lines of the Turks, the time arrived to use the cavalry, upon whom in the following days the brunt of the fighting descended. About 10.00 a fast-moving body of horsemen appeared from the rear. It was the 1st Australian Light Horse Brigade, who, as they neared the crest, broke into a gallop, and with a thundering roar, dashed down towards the wadi ... In their wake followed a number of motor cars and many horsemen wearing the red cap bands and tabs of the staff.

— Lieutenant Robert H. Goodsall, Territorial Battery, Royal Field Artillery

==== Hareira redoubt ====
After the attacks by the 60th (London) Division supported by the 10th (Irish) Division, Ottoman defenders had been forced to withdraw from the Kauwukah and Rushdi systems on 6 November, back to the Hareira redoubt on the far side of the Wadi esh Sheria. Then the 10th (Irish), 60th (London) and 74th Divisions carried out the second stage of the attack. During the morning the 10th (Irish) Division extended their advance westwards to attack the entrenched, huge mound bristling with fortifications at Hareira redoubt, situated on a high mound 500 yards (460 m) across the top, which had been strengthened with wire. This prominent position across the Gaza to Beersheba road on the western bank of the Wadi esh Sheria, had been easily defended by the Ottoman garrison during the Second Battle of Gaza, but now with the loss of the Kauwukah and Rushdi trench systems the approach for the Irish infantry division was no less difficult as the redoubt dominated the surrounding countryside. The very strong redoubt, garrisoned by 200 soldiers with 30 machine guns, included two lines of deep trenches with many machine gun emplacements.

The 31st Brigade (10th Division) advanced to the attack, supported by the 68th Brigade RFA and one howitzer battery of the C/268th. However, at 07:00 when their attack was launched, because of a breakdown in communications there was no covering barrage, the infantry brigade advanced over open ground "in full view of the enemy," across an open flat plain swept from end to end by artillery, machine gun and rifle fire. During the early stage of their advance, they were attacked by Ottoman shells which, mostly fell in the rear of the quickly moving soldiers, but as they closed in on the redoubt, they were also attacked by heavy machine-gun fire. The 2nd Battalion, Royal Irish Fusiliers with two companies of the 5th Battalion Royal Irish Fusiliers, advanced directly towards the redoubt, with their left flank on the long trench which extended from the Rushdi system across the Gaza to Beersheba road. Following on the right flank the 6th Battalion Royal Inniskilling Fusiliers, with four machine guns advanced towards the separate entrenchments to the north-east of the redoubt, defending Khan Abu Jerra. (Note: Grainger claims the 6th Royal Irish Rifles (29th Brigade) and Royal Irish Fusiliers led the attack supported by the 6th Inniskilling Fusiliers (31st Brigade). [Grainger 2006 p. 146])

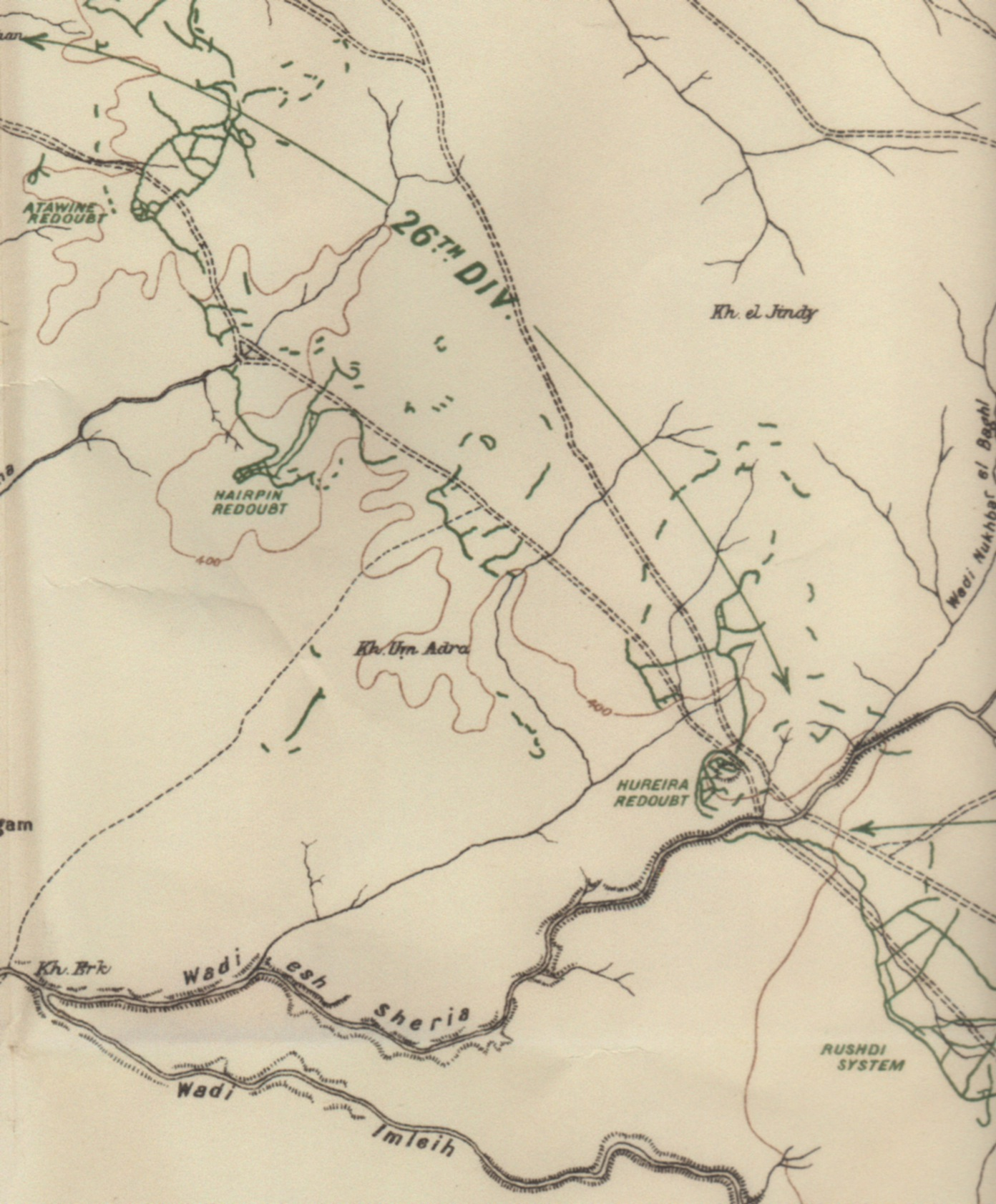
Atawineh, Hairpin and Hareira Redoubts

The 2nd Battalion Royal Irish Fusiliers was halted about 300 yards (270 m) from the redoubt, when their supporting company began to work around the southern face of the redoubt along the wadi, while the Inniskilling Fusiliers on the right attacked and captured the "hairpin-shaped" defence north of the wadi, threatening the Khan Abu Jerra defences, these two attacked also threatened the Hareira redoubt with encirclement. (Note: This was probably a reference to the Hairpin redoubt on Sausage Ridge, 5,000 yards (4,600 m) north-west of the Hareira redoubt, on the Gaza to Beersheba road. [Falls 1930 Vol. 2 Map 8]) When this became clear, most of the garrison evacuated the Hareira redoubt, before the Irish Fusiliers assaulted the position with machine guns, trench mortars and overwhelming numbers. The Irish Fusiliers captured 28 prisoners and four large trench mortars, while the Inniskilling Fusiliers captured two 150 mm howitzers, the attackers suffering 276 casualties during the fighting. Later the Labbi and Mustapha trenches to the north-west and north of the redoubt were occupied without opposition. (Note: Wavell claims an already existing break in the Gaza to Beersheba line was widened when the Hareira redoubt was captured by the 10th (Irish) Division. [Wavell 1968 p. 137])

Last night was bitterly cold and I got no sleep. Had no coat or blanket. The men were cold too but for a fair amount of digging to do reversing trenches in case of counter attack. To-day was the 'grand finale' of the Turks great Gaza–Beersheba line. We finished clearing up the Rushdi system with very little opposition and then attacked the Hareira system. Hareira is a hollow hill like a volcano about 200 feet high, round the south-eastern side of which runs the Wadi-Es-Sheria in a deep gulley. This gulley has on its southern side a lower hill or spur of the main hill. The Turk seem to have expected the attack from the south and west and also up the Wadi bed, as most of the defences were facing that way, and they had large mortars aligned on the Wadi as the most likely place for attack. However, Allenby's scheme of rolling up the Turks left allowed us to attack this redoubt from the eastward and although the Division were allotted most of the day to take the place, it was ours in a couple of hours, with a lot of prisoners and supplies, but, better still, a water supply and a clear road for the cavalry.

— Captain Drury, 6th Dublin Fusiliers, 10th (Irish) Division, Diary entry on Wednesday 7 November

During the morning of 8 November, a detachment of the 10th (Irish) Division advanced along the road to Gaza, when they found touch with the Composite Force of the XXI Corps near Atawineh. This was the final action of the XX Corps, before they handed back to the XXI Corps their borrowed transport, making it impossible for the XX Corps in advance of their present position. During the series of battles fought by the XX Corps from 31 October, the corps had captured 2,177 prisoners, 45 guns, seven trench mortars and 50 machine guns, and suffered almost 5,500 casualties.

==== Infantry attack Sheria position ====
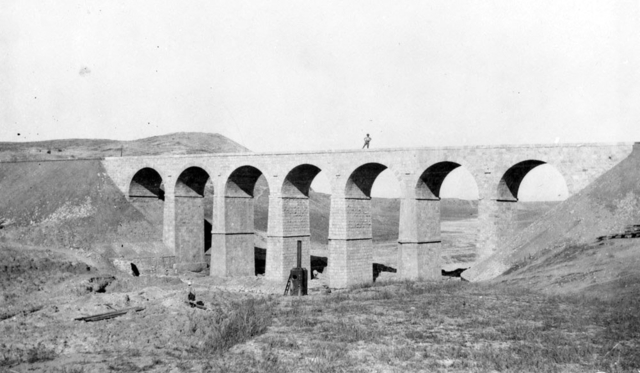
Sheria viaduct crossing the Wadi esh Sheria with Tel esh Sheria in the background left

Having captured the Sheria railway station on 6 November, the 60th (London) Division's advance towards Tel el Sheria was stopped when the Londoners, lit up by the light from the exploding ammunition dump, were targeted by Ottoman machine gunners from the shadows. Their attack was postponed until 03:30 the next morning. The focus of the Londoners' attack, the 250-foot-high (76 m) Tel el Sheria, was situated on the eastern side of the railway, beside the line, with the Wadi esh Sheria flowing across the southern side of the Tel and the Wadi Barrata flowing passed its western side. After flowing passed the Tel esh Sheria, the Wadi esh Sheria branched into the Wadi Abu Khuff, then after a short distance eastwards, followed a camel's hump, at first due north, then east and then south, to branch into the Wadi Barrata passed Khan Barrata, while the wadi eventually stretched eastwards towards Tel el Khuweilfe. A strong Ottoman rearguard formed partly from the Zuheilika Group and the 16th Division, commanded by Colonel Ali Fuad Bey, had taken up a fortified rearguard position with well-dug trenches, located in a carefully prepared area at the top of a ridge with a long bare slope approach, about 1 mile (1.6 km) north of Sheria railway station. (Note: This extensive position at Sheria including the entrenched defences, the location of the main XX Corps army camp, hospital and training depots, has not been described in any detail, in the sources listed in the References subsection.)

Although the attack by the 60th (London) Division was to be resumed at 03:30, to allow time for the incessant explosions of the Sheria ammunition dump, which continued until 02:30, to diminish, and although the leading battalions had begun moving forward at 03:30, a further postponement until 05:30 about an hour before sunrise, was necessary. The 2/17th Battalion London Regiment (180th Brigade) and the 2/22nd Battalion London Regiment (181st Brigade), which were to make the attack had some distance to march over broken ground, and the 2/22nd Battalion London Regiment did not arrive until 05:30. Then a bayonet attack was to be launched with machine gun, but no artillery support.

The attack was launched at daybreak by the 2/22nd and 2/23rd Battalions London Regiment advancing about 500 yards (460 m) on the eastern side of the railway, with the 2/21st and 2/24th Battalions London Regiment, (181st Brigade) further east. The 2/22nd and 2/23rd Battalions London Regiment advanced to the Samarra ridge, while the 2/21st and 2/24th Battalions, London Regiment had moved towards Barrata, when touch was lost until the morning. The position of the 180th Brigade had been uncovered during these movements, so the 2/22nd Battalion London regiment (181st Brigade) and the 2/20th Battalion London Regiment (180th Brigade) were ordered to move into touch with brigade headquarters, when the 2/23rd Battalion London Regiment joining them. Meanwhile, the 2/17th and 2/20th Battalions London Regiment (180th Brigade) advanced on the western side of the railway.

In the dim early morning light, the Ottoman defenders swept the bed of the wadi with machine gun and rifle fire from Tel esh Sheria, before facing the Londoner's attacks at close quarter, with bombs (probably grenades) and bayonets. The fighting was "especially fierce." (Note: Wavell claims Tel esh Sheria was captured at dawn on 7 November by the 60th (London) Division. [Wavell 1968 p. 137]) The 2/22nd Battalion London Regiment on the right and to the east of Tel esh Sheria "charged up the slope" to capture the Ottoman position. "The battalion then crossed the railway (which bent sharply eastward north of Tel esh Sheria), and established itself about a thousand yards beyond it." During this second advance they captured almost 100 prisoners. The 2/23rd Battalion, London Regiment which had closely followed the 2/22nd Battalion London Regiment, extended the line to the right. Later troops from the 181st Brigade extended the line to the left of the 74th (Yeomanry) Division which had captured/occupied Kh. Barrata. On the left of the railway the attack by the 180th Brigade was launched by the 2/17th and 2/20th Battalions, London Regiment. The 2nd/20th Battalion London Regiment charged silently across the wadi to engage in hand-to-hand fighting, before storming up Tel esh Sheria and capturing 74 prisoners, while the 2/17th Battalion pushed four machine guns onto a mound to the west of the brigade's position. Later the two battalions advanced about 1,500 yards (1,400 m) beyond Tel esh Sheria in touch with the 181st Brigade. These two brigades' attacks were equally successfully, although suffering about 400 casualties during the assaults. Nearly 200 prisoners were collected, while the Ottoman "dead left on the field outnumbered the prisoners."

The 60th (London) Division captured Tel el Sharia in the "early afternoon," but the defenders withdrew in "good order," to a long ridge on the north side of and overlooking, the Wadi esh Sheria, about 1,500 yards (1,400 m) north of the station, from which the Ottoman defenders dominated a long bare slope without any cover with machine gun and heavy artillery fire during the afternoon. (Note: It is difficult to identify where this new Ottoman position was located as Gullett's sketch indicates railway, roads, entrenchments and wadies but no ridge. [Falls 1930 Vol. 2 Map 8, Gullett 1941 p. 432]) The positions captured by the 60th (London) Division, including a bridgehead, suffered a very strong counterattack, launched against the 180th Brigade positions at about 09:30, which reached to within 200 yards (180 m) of the Londoners' lines. This attack was stopped by machine gun and rifle fire, supported by artillery, but the Londoners were unable to launch a counterattack. (Note: Falls describes several counter-attacks being easily "beaten off." [Falls 1930 Vol. 2 p. 109])

When the 60th (London) and 74th Divisions reached Sheria they found the Zuheilika Group with remnants of the 16th Division were fresh and well equipped, holding a strong position on the north side of the wadi which ran through the town. The approach across the wadi was swept by machine-gun fire and artillery was ranged on the crossings on both sides of the town. On the left two battalions of the 180th Brigade attacked the trenches on the north side while on the right two battalions of the 181st Brigade faced serious machine-gun fire and artillery. The Ottoman defenders had a group of machine guns on top of Tel es Sheria, a huge mound dominating the whole area, manned by the fresh Zuheilika group which resisted the Londoners' attack with "skill and determination throughout the day" and later mounted a counterattack. An attempt by the 4th Light Horse Brigade to dislodge them was unsuccessful.

==== Light horse charge ====
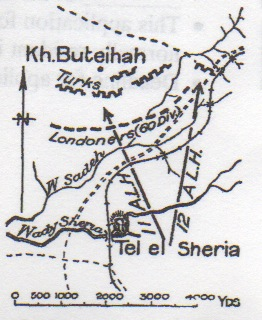
Gullett's sketch of attack on Kh Buteihah places the attack about a mile beyond Tel esh Sheria

With the attacks by the 180th and 181st Brigades stopped 1,500 yards (1,400 m) north of Sheria railway station, the Australian Mounted Division was ordered to attack and capture the Ottoman position, with the 179th Brigade acting as advanced guard. However, the Australian support was unable to dislodge the Ottoman rearguard and it was not until the evening of 7 November, that the position was captured by the reserve brigade of the 60th Division.

At 10:15, Chauvel ordered the Australian Mounted Division to "drive enemy from front of 60th Division" and to "gain touch with A. & N. Z Mounted Division." After quickly watering the horses, at about 11:00 the two regiments of the 4th Light Horse Brigade passed through the front of the 60th (London) Division, the 11th Light Horse Regiment on the left and the 12th Light Horse Regiment on the right. This movement attracted very heavy fire, which stopped the mounted attack. However, one troop of the 11th Light Horse Regiment which was not aware the attack had been halted, remained mounted to charge up the hill, leaping over a line of trenches to ride right through the Ottoman lines. They were annihilated a moment later, before they could dismount and retrieve their rifles from their backs. Meanwhile, the remainder of the 11th and the 12th Light Horse Regiments continued their attack dismounted, to gain a few hundred yards in front of the 60th (London) Division, where their advance was halted. They remained in position throughout the afternoon while being fired on by Ottoman machine guns. At the same time, the 60th (London) Division was also engaged in severe local fighting and, at times, suffered from very heavy shell fire.

==== Capture of Sheria ====
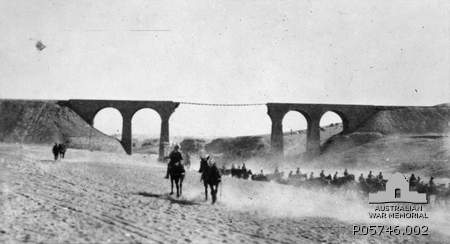
Australian Light Horsemen riding in the Wadi es Sheria east of Tel es Sheria, with the railway bridge destroyed by the retreating Yildirim Army Group in the background

The strong Ottoman position on the ridge dominated a long bare slope without any cover, from where they fired their machine guns and heavy artillery, at the Londoners during the afternoon. Just before dusk, Chauvel ordered the 179th Brigade, which had not taken part in the earlier fighting, to capture the strong Ottoman rearguard, which had stopped the combined light horse and infantry attacks. The Sheria position was finally captured and the high ground facing west. At 16:00 the 4th Light Horse Brigade supported by two artillery batteries of the Australian Mounted Division, was ordered to cross the Wadi esh Sharia dismounted, to cover the concentration of the 60th (London) Division, before the final assault on Tel esh Sheria, which took place just before dark The London Regiment battalions in the 179th Brigade had been ordered to move forward at the same time, with the 2/15th Battalion on the right and the 2/14th Battalion on the left leading, while the 2/13th and 2/16th Battalions remained in support. The attacking battalions and light horsemen crossed the Wadi esh Sheria at 17:00. Despite heavy shell fire, they crossed the low ground near the wadi, to drive the defenders from the northern bank of the wadi "with the bayonet", after some stubborn fighting, just on dark suffering 24 casualties. Later they advanced to establish an outpost line with its left on the Sheria to Huj road 4.5 miles (7.2 km) north of the Wadi esh Sheria, when patrols established the Ottoman rearguard had withdrawn. (Note: Bruce states that on 7 November the EEF advance "continued with little opposition." [Bruce 2002 p. 140]) After their eventual successful attack with the Londoners, across the Wadi esh Sheria, it was some time before the 4th Light Horse Brigade could disengage, when was withdrawn into corps reserve.

We were to move to Sheria after the 60th Division, but this was countermanded and we had nothing special to do except stroll about and see all that was going on, and to prevent any Turks doubling back into their trench systems ... The Desert Mounted Corps were waiting behind us for the word to push off and presently away they went. It was a thrilling sight, and the whole battle area was just perfect for using cavalry. They swept up the rising ground towards Sheria in a big left-handed sweep, moving in lines of sections at about 250-yard (230 m) interval between the lines. The frontage was about 2 miles (3.2 km), and the thunder of the hoofs and the glitter of arms was a sight never to be forgotten. They rounded up prisoners and guns, a train complete, a hospital, a bakery in full blast, and many other odds and ends. I saw 4 guns brought in and 750 prisoners and got a photo of them. One prisoner said he was a doctor, educated in the American College at Constantinople. I think he was Eurasian. He had a wife and children and carried his black bag of instruments. The little boy was greatly delighted with a piece of chocolate I gave him.

— Captain Drury, 6th Dublin Fusiliers, 10th (Irish) Division Diary Wednesday 7 November 1917

The 179th occupied the high ground facing west with the 180th Brigade concentrated behind them, with the 181st Brigade "so far as the tactical situation permitted in rear of Anzac Mounted Division." All units were ordered to prepare to move on Zuheilikah early the next morning.

The XX Corps casualties suffered from 31 October to 7 November, were 932 killed, 4,444 wounded and 108 missing. They captured 2,177 prisoners, 45 guns, seven trench mortars and 50 machine guns.

==== 5th Mounted Brigade ====
The Queen's Own Worcestershire Hussars marched as fourth units of the 5th Mounted Brigade column along the western slopes of the Arab el Teiaha from 01:30 on 7 November. At 07:00 D Squadron was detached to the 60th (London) Division while the remainder moved behind the Royal Gloucestershire Hussars and Warwickshire Yeomanry to reach the north bank of the Wadi Sheria at 16:00. During the day, the 5th Mounted Brigade had taken cover in the Wadi Barrata, east of and parallel to the railway and in other tributaries of the Wadi esh Sheria further east. Brigade commander asked permission to work round to the right, which was granted at 16:45. The 3rd Light Horse and the 5th Mounted Brigades were ordered to ride round the right flank of the 60th (London) Division to attack mounted. The 3rd Light Horse Brigade having just arrived from Karm 12 miles (19 km) away was in the rear. After riding 2 miles (3.2 km) to the east to find a place to cross the wadi, two regiments of the 5th Mounted Brigade drew swords and cantered out, "into the open north of the wadi" but returned after dark, without encountering any enemy. The 3rd Light Horse Brigade meanwhile advanced along the railway line to make touch with the 2nd Light Horse Brigade (Anzac Mounted Division) at 19:30. At 17:00 the Queen's Own Worcestershire Hussars moved off as the rear unit of the 5th Mounted Brigade to cooperate with the 3rd Light Horse Brigade in a night attack on the Zuneilika ridge. At 18:00 the brigade crossed the railway near the Wadi es Sadeh advancing 3 miles (4.8 km) east by north but failed to locate the 3rd Light Horse Brigade. At 20:00 the brigade returned to water the horses and bivouacked at 23:00 north of the Wadi Sheria.

==== Breakthrough advance to Kh. Ameidat ====
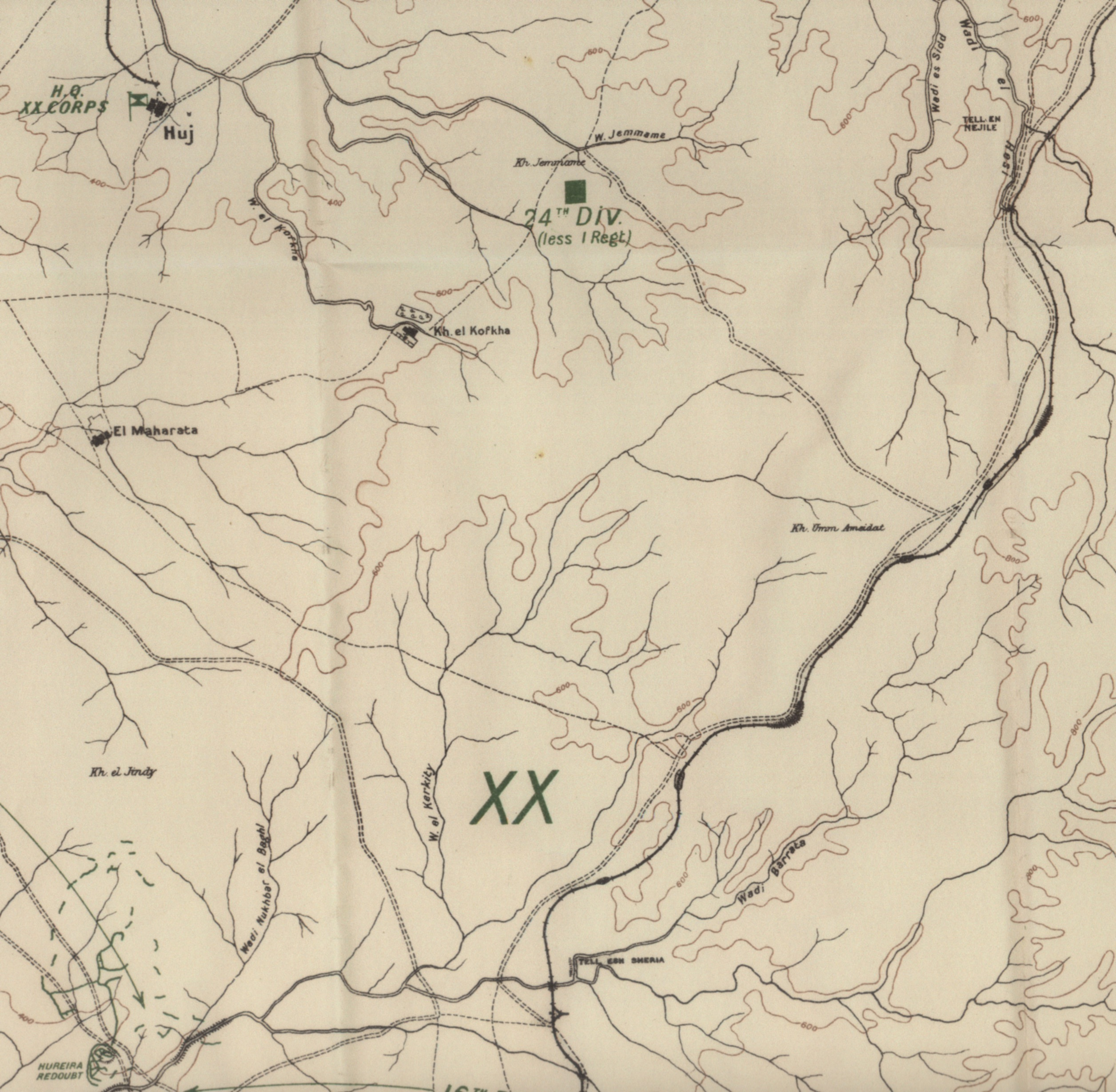
Dispositions in October shows positions of Sheria, Jemmameh and Huj.

A few days after Beersheba was captured the Ottoman line was broken by the infantry at Sheria, and between Gaza and the sea making possible the, "[u]p til then ... grandest cavalry drive of the war." During the late afternoon of 6 November Desert Mounted Corps had ordered the Anzac Mounted Division (less the New Zealand Mounted Brigade and Field Squadron) to take over the left of the Yeomanry Mounted Division line. By 09:00 the next morning, the Anzac Mounted Division was steadily pushing back Ottoman posts to gain space for manoeuvre, with orders to connect with the Australian Mounted Division at Kh. Buteihah. However, the Australian Mounted Division was not in a position to advance until after dark, because of delays in the capture of Tel esh Sheria. The result of the fighting on 6 November caused the Ottoman defenders to reinforce Tel esh Sheria and Khuweilfe, so that a gap opened between the two positions, covered for the first couple of miles on the left by the 60th (London) Division. The Anzac Mounted Division found the gap on the eastern side of Sheria, between Sheria and Kh Umm el Bakr, and went through at daylight on 7 November, heading north. (Note: Powles says this breakthrough was as a result of the capture of the Kauwukah trenches the day before, however these trenches were on the western side of Tel esh Sheria. [Powles 1922 p. 142, Falls 1930 Vol 2 Map 8] Woodward describes a gap in the centre of the Ottoman front line being created on 6 November when the Kauwukah and Rushdi trench systems were captured, and widened the next morning when Tel esh Sheria and the Hareira redoubt were captured. [Woodward 2006 p. 117] Wavell describes an already existing break in the Gaza to Beersheba line was widened when the Hareira redoubt was captured by the 10th (Irish) Division. [Wavell 1968 p. 137]) The division passed through the infantry (probably the 74th (Yeomanry) Division) to the west of Kh. Umm el Bakr at 05:00, and between 07:00 and 10:00 they advanced 5–10 miles (8–16 km) into Ottoman territory to reach Kh. Ameidat railway station on the Beersheba line. (Note: Falls describes the Anzac Mounted Division advance beginning at 08:50. [Falls 1930 Vol. 2 p. 114]) Here they captured hundreds of prisoners, along with a huge ammunition dump, before establishing a line from Ameidat Station to Kh. Shuteiwy el Oseibi.

Chauvel was informed at 11:00 that the Anzac Mounted Division had captured Ameidat Station, having passed through a gap in the Ottoman defences, which they found less than 2 miles (3.2 km) from Sheria. They found the gap after the division had crossed the Wadi esh Sheria just north of Kh Umm el Bakr. Had the Australian Mounted Division advanced to the "east of the Wadi Barrata", instead of coming to the aid of the 60th (London) Division, it could have also gone "through the gap."

News of the fall of Gaza arrived at 12:30, and in the afternoon patrols of one squadron each, were sent by the Anzac Mounted Division towards Tel en Nejile 4 miles (6.4 km) to the north on the railway, and towards Kh. Jemmame 4 miles (6.4 km) to the north-west. However, a strong Ottoman rearguard holding Tel Abu Dilakh ridge about 2 miles (3.2 km) away stopped them. Although the rearguard was attacked by the 2nd Light Horse Brigade, they continued to hold their position until after dark, when they retreated in good order, covering their infantry, artillery and supply convoys while steadily fighting the EEF, with well-placed machine guns. Although there was no water in the area, the 1st and 2nd Light Horse Brigades were joined by the 3rd Light Horse Brigade at 19:30.

== Aftermath ==
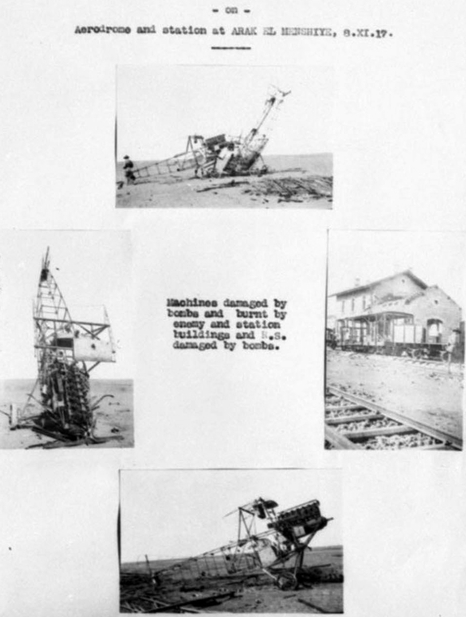
Results of bombing raid on Arak el Menshiyeh 8 November 1917

Soon after it had been established that Gaza had been evacuated, the Imperial Service Cavalry Brigade advanced north through the ruined city on 7 November, to capture a ridge overlooking Beit Hanun but without reinforcements, they were forced to withdraw to water.

When the EEF broke through at Sheria, the Yildirim Army Group had not enough reinforcements to respond, effectively." However, the Yildirim Army Group had gained most of 7 November to conduct an orderly retreat north, after destroying the stores in Tel el Sheria and Deir Sneid dumps and depots. The retreating forces, helped by well-placed rearguards, aimed to get far enough in front of the advancing EEF, to be able to prepare a strong defensive line, rest and then stop the EEF onslaught. Lack of water for the EEF in the area of their advance, also slowed the pursuit. The 60th (London) Division bivouacked for the night of 7/8 November on the Samarra ridge, to the south of the Wadi esh Sheria, after handing over its captures from the Kauwukah and Rushdi trench systems to the 10th (Irish) Division.

On the morning of 8 November, Ali Fuad's force consisting partly of the Zuheilika Group and remnants of the 16th Division commanded by Colonel Ali Fuad Bey was operating independently of the Seventh and Eighth Armies to the north of Tel esh Sheria.

During the morning of 8 November, the 52nd (Lowland) Division's 156th Brigade advanced north to the Wadi Hesi, their 155th and 157th Brigades captured Sausage Ridge. However, the strength of the rearguard and their determined fierce fighting for Sausage Ridge, prevented the 155th and 157th Brigades capturing the position until 21:00. By then the retreating Seventh and Eighth Armies had had two full days to withdraw.

The Desert Mounted Corps' first objective on 8 November was the capture of the water at Nejile, and Huj on their way towards the Mediterranean coast, where they hoped to cut the Ottoman line of retreat from Gaza. The Anzac Mounted Division captured the water at Jemmameh, while the Australian Mounted Division with the 60th (London) Division, advanced to capture Huj. Their 5th Mounted Brigade captured some guns during a second mounted charge, after the 31 October charge at Beersheba. The Yeomanry Mounted Division and the Imperial Camel Brigade were ordered to move from the Tel el Khuweilfe area to join the pursuit by Desert Mounted Corps and the Sheria water supply was to be developed and reserved for the Yeomanry Mounted Division.
