= French Detachment of Palestine and Syria =

- Active: 1917–1919
- Country: France
- Branch: French Army
- Engagements: World War I; Sinai and Palestine campaign; Third Battle of Gaza; Battle of Hareira and Sheria; Battle of Megiddo (1918); Battle of Sharon

Commanders
- Notable commanders: Gilles de Philpin de Piépape; Maurice Bailloud

The French Detachment of Palestine and Syria (French: Détachement Français de Palestine et de Syrie) was the name given to French forces in the Middle East from 1917 onwards, within the Egyptian Expeditionary Force. Although they were commanded in the field by Colonel Gilles de Philpin de Piépape, they were overseen by General Maurice Bailloud who was the Inspector-General. The detachment arrived at Rafah on 25 May 1917.

== Composition ==
Whilst its mounted troops served elsewhere in the 5th Light Horse Brigade, the rest of the organisation served alongside the 54th (East Anglian) Infantry Division. It consisted of three labour companies (staffed by men of the 5th Battalion 115th fr:Régiment d'infanterie territoriale), three artillery batteries and the following combat troops:

- Régiment de Marche de Tirailleurs;
  - 7th Battalion, 1st Regiment of Tirailleurs Algériens
  - 9th Battalion, 2nd Regiment of Tirailleurs Algériens
- Régiment de Marche de la Légion d'Orient
  - 1st Battalion Arméniens
  - 2nd Battalion Arméniens
  - 1 Company Syrians
- 1 Squadron dismounted Spahis
- 1 machine gun platoon.

The two battalions of Tirailleurs Algériens and the rear-echelon battalion of Infanterie Territoriale arrived at Port Said on 21 April 1917. They were accompanied by supporting elements of an ambulance, veterinary and administrative staff. The Légion d'Orient's Syrian company arrived at Port Said on 6 February 1918. The first and second battalions arrived there at the end of April and 15 July 1918 respectively. All three were shipped from Cyprus in 1918.

Capitaine Kerversau's squadron of Spahis embarked aboard the Hyperia in Bizerte on 22 July 1918, for transit to Alexandria, along with a machine gun platoon transported by mules commanded by Lieutenant Delahaye. On 28 July at 9.30pm, the ship was torpedoed at a location more than eighty miles northwest of Port Said. As well as a number of the ship's crew being killed, the horses were lost. One corporal and eighteen other ranks of the squadron perished. As a consequence, the Spahi squadron and machine gun platoon took part in the remainder of the campaign dismounted, alongside the infantry of the DFPS.

The men of the DFPS were to see combat at the Third Battle of Gaza, Battle of Hareira and Sheria, Battle of Megiddo (1918), and a number of actions throughout the Battle of Sharon during the Sinai and Palestine Campaign.
