= William Grant (general) =

Australian Army officer

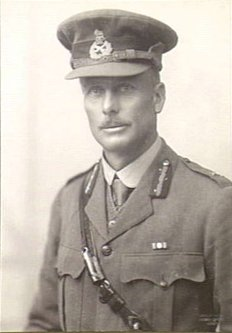
- Brigadier General William Grant in 1917
- Born: 30 September 1870; Stawell, Victoria
- Died: 25 May 1939 (aged 68); Dirranbandi, Queensland
- Military career
- Allegiance: Australia
- Branch: Australian Army
- Service years: 1901–1928
- Rank: Brigadier General
- Commands: 1st Cavalry Brigade (1919–25); 4th Light Horse Brigade (1917–19); 9th Light Horse Regiment (1915–16); 11th Light Horse Regiment (1915, 1916–17); 3rd (Darling Downs) Light Horse (1912–15); 14th Light Horse (1910–12)
- Conflicts: First World War; Gallipoli Campaign; Sinai and Palestine Campaign; Second Battle of Gaza; Battle of Beersheba; Second Battle of the Jordan; Battle of Samakh
- Awards: Companion of the Order of St Michael and St George; Distinguished Service Order & Bar; Colonial Auxiliary Forces Officers' Decoration; Mentioned in Despatches (4); Commander of the Order of the Nile (Egypt)
- Other work: Pastoralist

Brigadier General William Grant, CMG, DSO & Bar, VD (30 September 1870 – 25 May 1939) was an Australian Army colonel and temporary brigadier general in the First World War.

== Early life and career ==
William Grant was born on 30 September 1870 in Stawell, Victoria, the son of a miner. He was educated at Brighton Grammar School and Ormond College at the University of Melbourne, graduating with a Bachelor of Civil Engineering (BCE) in 1893. He worked in railway construction in New South Wales but after his father's death in 1894 he became a pastoralist, purchasing Bowenville Station on the Darling Downs in Queensland in 1896.

Grant was commissioned as a lieutenant in the Queensland Mounted Infantry on 1 January 1901. He advanced rapidly and became commander of the 14th Light Horse in 1910, and was promoted from major to lieutenant colonel on 18 December 1911. He was still in command when the First World War broke out.

== First World War ==
Grant joined the Australian Imperial Force on 16 March 1915, taking command of the 11th Light Horse Regiment. Part of the 4th Light Horse Brigade, it was sent to Egypt dismounted and there broken up on 26 August 1915. The 11th Light Horse Regiment was sent to Gallipoli, and there itself broken up, with a squadron being attached to each of the 2nd, 5th and 9th Light Horse Regiments. When the commander of the 9th Light Horse, Lieutenant Colonel Reynell was killed in the fighting for Hill 60 on 29 August 1915, Grant took over command of his regiment. He remained with the 9th Light Horse until he was sent for duty at the rest camp on 2 December 1915.

When the 11th Light Horse was reformed in Egypt on 22 February 1916, Grant was given command again. At Romani, the 11th Light Horse formed part of a mobile column of light horse and took part in the defence of the Suez Canal.

At Maghara in October, the 11th Light Horse led a column on a night march across the desert, navigating by the stars. On the second night of the march, dense fog closed in and hid the stars, but somehow Grant, who apparently had a phenomenal sense of position and direction, managed to lead the column through the desert to emerge at daybreak directly in front of the Turkish position.

For his part in the Sinai and Palestine Campaign, Grant was awarded the Distinguished Service Order (DSO).

On 14 February 1917, Grant led the 11th Light Horse out from Serapeum on a mission to sweep the remaining Turkish troops from the Sinai Peninsula. Grant learned from a British pilot that the Turks were evacuating, Nekhl, a significant town in the central Sinai, situated roughly in the centre of the Sinai, atop the desert ranges. His men entered Nekhl riding with fixed bayonets on 17 February. The light horse had travelled some 150 miles in seven days across steep and rocky mountain tracks. Only a few Turks and Arabs were captured, but the action marked the end of the campaign in the Sinai.

In February 1917, the 4th Light Horse Brigade re-formed and the 11th Light Horse Regiment rejoined it. On 13 August 1917, Grant became commander of the 3rd Light Horse Brigade and was promoted to temporary brigadier general. Then on 13 September 1917, he took over command of the 4th Light Horse Brigade, becoming a colonel and temporary brigadier general.

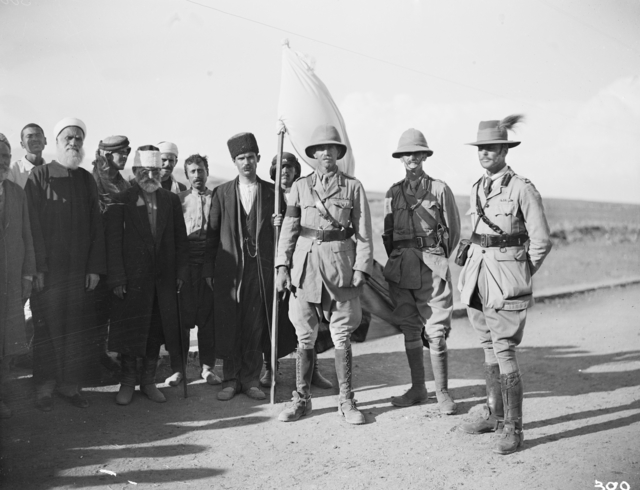
A group (including Brigadier General Grant, 4th Brigade, on the right), taken at Kuneitra, after the surrender of the town to Major General Hodgson, commander of the Australian Mounted Division (left), on 28 September 1918.

The Desert Mounted Corps began its most famous campaign on the night of 30 October. The tactics were similar to those at Rafa and Magdhaba, with the mounted troops making a surprise night march, enveloping the left and rear of the enemy's position at Beersheba and attacking it from the east while the infantry attacked frontally from the south. The ANZAC Mounted Division was held up at Tel el Saba, the hill overlooking Beersheba, where the defenders held on until captured by the New Zealanders late in the day.

Lieutenant General Harry Chauvel ordered Grant to attempt a mounted attack on Beersheba, his goal being to take the town wells before they could be destroyed. The light horse did not carry swords but had sharpened their bayonet points some days before in anticipation of such a tactic. The 4th and 12th Light Horse Regiments formed up with their squadrons in three lines, each about 300 to 500 metres apart. Wielding their bayonets like swords, they moved forward at a trot while the 13-pounders of the British Notts Battery suppressed Turkish machine guns. Grant initially rode in the lead, but dropped back to the reserve line once the column was headed in the correct direction so as to control their subsequent movements. Three Turkish batteries opposed the light horsemen but they moved forward so swiftly that the Turks could not range on them. The light horsemen swarmed over the Turkish positions and swept into the town, capturing all but two of the seventeen wells before they could be destroyed. For his part, Grant was personally decorated with a Bar to his DSO by the commander-in-chief, General Sir Edmund Allenby, the next day.

Grant served as acting commander of the Australian Mounted Division from 15 December 1917 to 2 January 1918.

During the raid on Es Salt in May 1918, Grant's 4th Light Horse Brigade was given the task of guarding the flank. When the plan failed, it was on his brigade that the main Turkish blow fell. The light horsemen fought hard but the Turks subjected them to fierce artillery and machine gun fire, and were able to drive them from their positions. Grant managed to avoid being overrun, and was able to withdraw by night without issue. Nine of the twelve British guns supporting the brigade were lost. Grant was blamed for the loss of the guns and for faulty defensive positions.

In his final campaign, Grant was ordered to capture the town of Semakh, on the southern shores of Lake Tiberias. With only half his brigade available, Grant surprised the defenders with a quick night approach and a moonlight assault with drawn swords. Grant used his machine guns to reduce the enemy's fire. The garrison, half of whom were Germans, fought hard and the light horsemen had to fight from building to building, but the town was eventually captured.

Grant commanded the Australian Mounted Division from 8 November 1918 to 24 December 1918. For his services, he was made a Companion of the Order of St Michael and St George (CMG) in the 1919 New Year Honours.

== Post war ==
Grant embarked for Australia on 29 April 1919, where he commanded the 1st Cavalry Brigade from 1920 to 1925. He retired from the Army in 1928.

After the war Grant returned to his property at Bowenville but he sold it in 1931 and moved to Brisbane. Then in 1934 he purchased another property near Dirranbandi in southern Queensland.

William Grant died suddenly from a heart attack on 25 May 1939 and was cremated with full military honours in Brisbane.

== See also ==
- List of Australian generals
