= George Macarthur-Onslow =

Australian Army officer and politician (1875–1931)

Brigadier General George Macarthur-Onslow CMG, DSO, VD

Chairman of Wollondilly Shire Council
- In office 15 June 1906 – 3 December 1906

1st Shire President of Wollondilly
- In office 3 December 1906 – 11 January 1907
- Succeeded by: John Edward Moore
- In office 10 December 1926 – 12 September 1931
- Preceded by: Edgar Henry Kirk Downes
- Succeeded by: George Joseph Spearing

Personal details
- Born: 2 May 1875 Camden, Colony of New South Wales
- Died: 12 September 1931 (aged 56) Camden, New South Wales, Australia

Military service
- Allegiance: Australia
- Branch/service: Australian Army
- Years of service: 1895–1931
- Rank: Brigadier General
- Commands: 1st Cavalry Division (1927–31); 5th Light Horse Brigade (1918); 7th Light Horse Regiment (1915–18); 9th Light Horse Regiment (1912–14)
- Battles/wars: First World War; Gallipoli Campaign; Sinai and Palestine Campaign; Battle of Romani; Battle of Beersheba; Battle of Jerusalem; First Transjordan attack on Amman; Second Transjordan attack on Shunet Nimrin and Es Salt; Capture of Damascus
- Awards: Companion of the Order of St Michael and St George; Distinguished Service Order; Colonial Auxiliary Forces Officers' Decoration; Mentioned in Despatches (2); Commander of the Order of the Nile (Egypt)

Brigadier General George MacLeay Macarthur-Onslow, CMG, DSO, VD (2 May 1875 – 12 September 1931) was an Australian grazier and army officer who commanded light horse units during the First World War.

== Early life and career ==
George MacLeay Macarthur-Onslow was born 2 May 1875 in the town of Camden, New South Wales. He was the great grandson of John Macarthur and Elizabeth Macarthur. When his father Arthur Onslow died in 1882, his mother Elizabeth changed her name to Macarthur-Onslow and took George and his five siblings to England in 1887. In England George was educated at Rugby School. There his mother studied dairy farming, and on returning to Camden in 1889 she founded a dairy farming complex, the Camden Vale Milk Co, which eventually merged with the Dairy Farmers' Co-operative Milk Co in 1928.

On 5 April 1895, he was commissioned a second lieutenant in the New South Wales Mounted Rifles and was promoted to lieutenant the next year. In July 1903 he became a lieutenant in the 2nd Light Horse Regiment. He was promoted to captain in 1911 and major on 16 February 1914, commanding the 9th Light Horse Regiment.

== First World War ==
In August 1914, Macarthur-Onslow was given command of the 1st Light Horse Regiment, part of the Australian Imperial Force. While organising the regiment, he had to relinquish command and undergo an operation for appendicitis. On 1 November 1914, he was again appointed to the AIF, this time as second in command of the 7th Light Horse Regiment.

The 7th Light Horse Regiment arrived in Egypt in February 1915 where it trained at Maadi. In May, it received orders to move to Gallipoli for dismounted service, arriving on 19 May. Macarthur-Onslow took over command of the 7th Light Horse in October and was promoted to lieutenant colonel on 22 November. On 17 December he organised the famous cricket match at Shell Green.

At Katia on 5 August 1916, the 7th Light Horse, advancing in a single line, came under fire from a party of Turks some 200 metres in front of them. The Turks were rushed and overwhelmed. Macarthur-Onslow then advanced from the position with three men, 20 metres in front of his troopers; all four were hit by Turks concealed in front of them. Severely wounded, Macarthur-Onslow was evacuated. He was mentioned in despatches and awarded the Distinguished Service Order (DSO).

Macarthur-Onslow returned to the regiment in time to take part in the Battle of Beersheba, leading the 7th on a night march around Gaza. When the order to retire was received, he concentrated the regiment, and returned that way, having ridden around the town. He later led his regiment through the battles for Gaza, the pursuit across the Philistine Plain, and the operations across the Jordan.

From May to August 1918, Macarthur-Onslow was acting commander of the 2nd Light Horse Brigade in the absence of the Brigadier General Granville Ryrie. On 3 September 1918, he took command of the newly formed 5th Light Horse Brigade, with the temporary rank of brigadier general.

In January 1919, Macarthur-Onslow was evacuated with typhoid and returned to Australia four months later. For his services in Palestine, he was twice more mentioned in despatches, and appointed a Companion of the Order of St Michael and St George (CMG).

== Later life ==
After the war, Macarthur-Onslow was elected councillor for Wollondilly Shire, alderman of Camden City Council and mayor of Camden. Like his brother James Macarthur-Onslow, he was aide de camp to the Governor General from 1920 to 1923. He commanded the 1st Cavalry Division from 1927 to 1931.

He died on 12 September 1931 and was buried in the family cemetery on the Camden Park Estate.

== See also ==
- List of Australian generals
