= 11th Light Horse Regiment (Australia) =

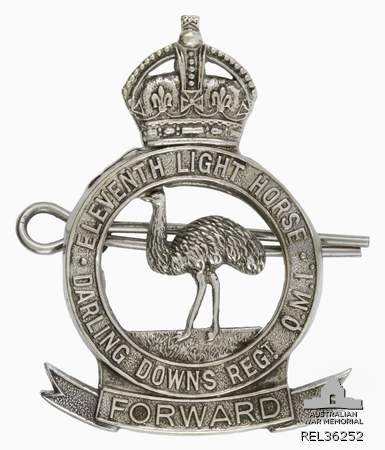
- 11th Light Horse Regiment hat badge
- Active: 1915–1919; 1921–1943
- Country: Australia
- Branch: Australian Army
- Type: Mounted infantry
- Size: Regiment
- Part of: 4th Light Horse Brigade
- Motto: Forward
- Engagements: First World War: North African Campaign; Gallipoli campaign; Sinai and Palestine Campaign
- Battle honours: Gallipoli 1915–1916; Suvla; Sari Bair; Egypt 1915–1917; Romani; Palestine 1917-1918; Beersheba; El Mughar; Nebi Samwill; Jerusalem; Jordan (Es Salt); Megiddo; Sharon; Samakh; Damascus 1918

Insignia
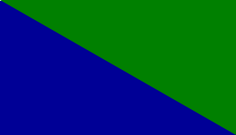
- Unit colour patch

The 11th Light Horse Regiment was a mounted infantry regiment of the Australian Army during the First World War. The regiment was raised in August 1914, and assigned to the 4th Light Horse Brigade. The regiment fought against the forces of the Ottoman Empire, in Egypt, at Gallipoli, on the Sinai Peninsula, and in Palestine and Jordan. After the armistice the regiment eventually returned to Australia in March 1919. For its role in the war the regiment was awarded fourteen battle honours. During the inter-war years, the regiment was re-raised as a part-time unit based in the Darling Downs region of Queensland. It was later converted to a motor regiment during the Second World War but was disbanded in 1943 without having been deployed overseas.

== History ==
The 11th Light Horse Regiment was raised in Queensland and South Australia, and came together in Brisbane in May 1915. Light horse regiments normally comprised twenty-five officers and 497 other ranks serving in three squadrons, each of six troops. Each troop was divided into eight sections, of four men each. In action one man of each section, was nominated as a horse holder reducing the regiment's rifle strength by a quarter. Once formed the regiment was assigned to the 4th Light Horse Brigade.

All Australian Light Horse regiments used cavalry unit designations, but were mounted infantry, and mounted exclusively on the Australian Waler horse.

=== Aden ===
The 11th Light Horse Regiment divided into two contingents sailed for the Middle East in June 1915. The first group were diverted to Aden to assist the small British garrison against an expected assault from Ottoman forces. The attack did not materialise and the regiment's contingent re-embarked in July 1915, never having seen any action.

=== Gallipoli campaign ===
When the Australian infantry units were dispatched to Gallipoli, it was thought the terrain was unsuitable for mounted troops, and the light horse regiments remained in Egypt. However, heavy casualties amongst the Australian infantry resulted in the deployment of the 4th Light Horse Brigade as reinforcements in August 1915. The 4th Light Horse Brigade was subsequently disbanded. On arrival, the regiment was split up to reinforce other light horse regiments that had landed earlier that were understrength. The regiment's A Squadron served with the 2nd Light Horse Regiment, B Squadron the 5th Light Horse Regiment, and C Squadron to the 9th Light Horse Regiment.

=== Sinai and Palestine campaign ===
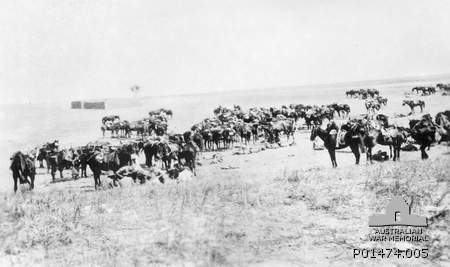
C Squadron resting their horses en route to Beersheba

When the British forces were withdrawn from Gallipoli, the 11th Light Horse Regiment was reformed in Egypt. Their first deployment was in defence of the Suez Canal in July 1916, and patrolling into the Sinai desert. In 1916, plans were made to convert the 11th Light Horse, along with the 4th and 12th Light Horse Regiments into cameleers, but this plan was not followed through. In early 1917, the 4th Light Horse Brigade was re-formed as part of the Imperial Mounted Division (later designated as the Australian Mounted Division), and the 11th Light Horse Regiment was re-assigned to the brigade, having been unattached until this time.

In April 1917, following the withdrawal of Ottoman forces, the regiment moved into Palestine. Its first battle as a regiment, was the unsuccessful second battle of Gaza, where they fought on foot. In October, during their next battle at Beersheba while the other two regiments in the brigade, the 4th and 12th Light Horse Regiments took part in a mounted charge, the 11th was providing flank protection and was too widely dispersed to take part. They did, however, with the 12th Light Horse carry out a charge on 7 November, during the Battle of Sheria. Faced with heavy Ottoman gun-fire, the regiment had to dismount to continue the attack, but were eventually forced to withdraw.

When Gaza was captured in November 1917, the Ottoman forces withdrew into Palestine, and the 11th were involved in the pursuit. They then spent the early months of 1918, training and resting. At this time, the regiment's numbers were bolstered by the 20th Reinforcements contingent which consisted of around thirty young Indigenous Australians, mostly from Queensland. This group became known as the Queensland Black Watch.

The regiment then moved to the River Jordan, taking part in the raid on Es Salt in April and May. They were still on the river in July, helping to defeat heavy German and Ottoman attacks in July.

In August 1918, the regiment was issued with the traditional cavalry sabre and training began in cavalry tactics, so they were ready to resume the British advance in September. Advancing along the coast, the 11th Light Horse took part in the battle of Samakh on 25 September. The regiment first charged the Ottoman defences on horseback using their sabres, then dismounted and cleared the town with their rifles and bayonets. The Ottoman Empire signed the Armistice of Mudros on 30 October 1918, and the war in the Middle East ended. However, the regiment had to return to Egypt, where rioting had started in March 1919. Finally, in July 1919, the regiment sailed for Australia. The war cost the regiment over 100 per cent casualties, with 95 killed and 521 wounded.

=== Interwar years and subsequent service ===
In 1921, Australia's part-time military forces were re-organised to perpetuate the numerical designations of the AIF following its demobilisation. Through this process, the 11th Light Horse was re-raised as a Citizens Forces unit within the 1st Military District in the Darling Downs region of Queensland, drawing lineage from several previously existing units through which it could trace its history back to the 14th Australian Light Horse Regiment (Queensland Mounted Infantry), which had been formed in 1903.

This unit remained in existence throughout the inter-war years, and in December 1941 it was converted into a motor regiment, adopting the designation of the "11th Motor Regiment (Darling Downs Light Horse) (QMI)". In 1943, the regiment was re-designated the "11th Australian Motor Regiment" and was gazetted as an AIF unit, meaning that it could be deployed outside of Australian territory to fight if necessary. Nevertheless, as part of a gradual demobilisation of the Australian Army the regiment was deemed surplus to requirements and on 3 July 1943 it was disbanded without having seen operational service during the war; its personnel were re-allocated to the 2/10th Infantry Battalion as reinforcements. The regiment was part of the 1st Cavalry Brigade and then later, the 1st Motor Brigade when the cavalry units were reorganised.

== Battle honours ==
The 11th Light Horse regiment was awarded the following battle honours:

- Suvla · Sari Bair · Gallipoli 1915–1916 · Romani · Egypt 1915–1917 · Gaza-Beersheba · El Mughar · Nebi Samwill · Jerusalem
  Jordan (Es Salt) · Megiddo · Sharon · Palestine 1917–1918 · Damascus 1918

== Commanding officers ==
The following officers commanded the 11th Light Horse Regiment during the First World War:

- Lieutenant Colonel William Grant DSO
- Lieutenant Colonel John William Parsons DSO, VD
- Lieutenant Colonel Percival John Bailey DSO
