= Reginald Spencer Browne =

Australian general

- Colonel Spencer Browne
- Born: 13 July 1856; Oaklands, New South Wales
- Died: 9 November 1943 (aged 87); Brisbane, Queensland
- Military career
- Allegiance: Australia
- Branch: Australian Army
- Service years: 1887–1921
- Rank: Major General
- Commands: Molonglo Concentration Camp; 2nd Command Depot; Training and General Base Depot; 6th Infantry Brigade; 4th Light Horse Brigade; 5th Light Horse Brigade; 13th Light Horse Regiment
- Conflicts: Second Boer War; First World War; Gallipoli Campaign
- Awards: Companion of the Order of the Bath; Mentioned in Despatches (2)
- Other work: State president of the Returned Sailors and Soldiers Imperial League of Australia; A Journalist's Memories (1927)

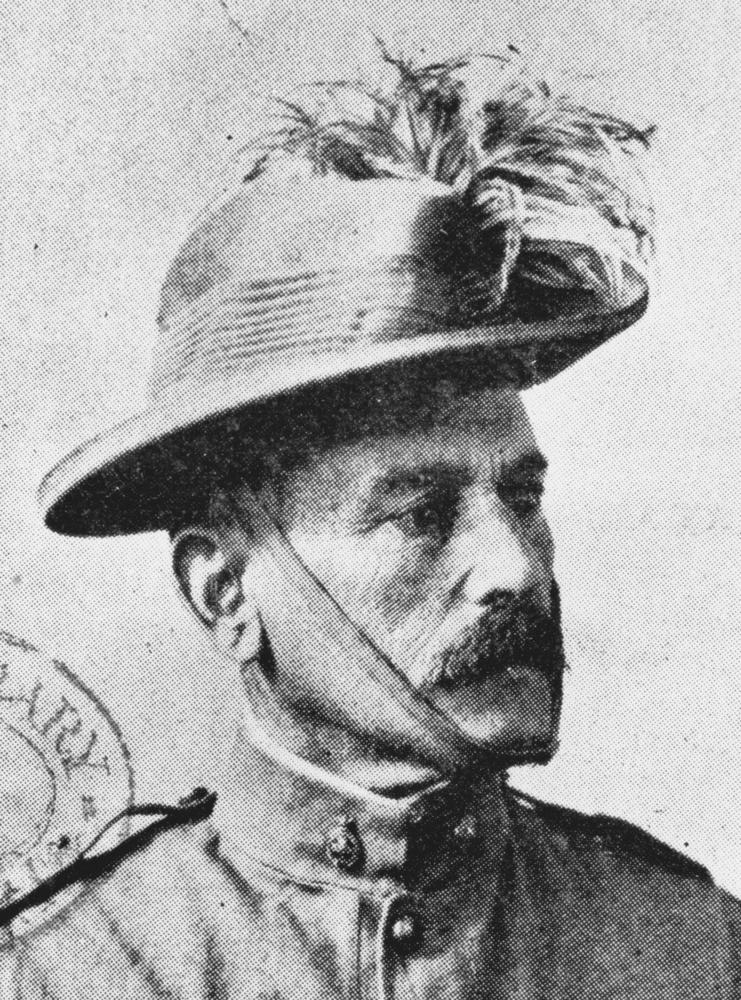
Major R. Spencer Browne. Commander of the 1st battalion of the Qld Mounted Infantry, 1901

Major General Reginald Spencer Browne, CB (13 July 1856 – 9 November 1943) was a journalist, newspaper editor, and an Australian Imperial Force general in the First World War.

== Early life and career ==
Reginald Spencer Browne (a.k.a. Browne, R. Spencer; Browne, Spencer; Spencer-Browne, Reginald) was born at Oaklands, Appin, New South Wales on 13 July 1856, the son of a pastoralist. His father, also born in Australia, was a superintending officer of yeomanry. Browne was educated at Appin, Corowa and in England. He became journalist, working for several newspapers including the Albury Banner and the Deniliquin Pastoral Times, before becoming sub editor of the Townsville Herald in 1877, editor of the Cooktown Herald in 1878 and editor of the Brisbane Observer in 1881. In 1882 Browne joined the Brisbane Courier, and stayed there nearly all of his working life, until 1936.

Browne joined the Queensland Mounted Infantry in 1887 and was commissioned a lieutenant. During the shearers strike of 1891, Browne took commanded a flying column which put down the strike; he took part in these actions even though he was sympathetic to the unions cause. Browne was promoted to captain in 1891 and then to major in 1896.

Browne volunteered for service in South Africa during the Second Boer War, and sailed in November 1899 with the 1st Queensland Contingent. For his services, he was appointed a Companion of the Order of the Bath, awarded the Queen's South Africa Medal with five clasps, and was mentioned in despatches. Browne returned to Australia in November 1900.

In 1903 Browne became commanding officer of the 13th Light Horse Regiment with the rank of lieutenant colonel. Then in 1906 he became the commander of the 5th Light Horse Brigade and was promoted to full colonel. He then transferred onto the list of Reserve of Officers in 1911.

== First World War ==
Browne joined the Australian Imperial Force on 16 March 1915 as commander of the 4th Light Horse Brigade. This brigade was sent to Egypt, but was dismounted and broke up on 26 August 1915. Browne's new unit, the 13th Light Horse Regiment, was assigned to the newly formed 2nd Division, with which it served at Anzac Cove.

On 28 August 1915, Browne was appointed officer commanding Australian Details Egypt, responsible for training reinforcements. In September Major General Legge sent for him to replace the commander of the 6th Infantry Brigade who had drowned following the torpedoing of the troop transport Southland. Browne took over the brigade on 8 September 1915 and served at Lone Pine and Quinn's Post, but at the age of 59 the rigours of the campaign combined with his age began to take its toll. Nonetheless, he stayed until he was evacuated on 10 December 1915.

On his return to Egypt, Browne was transferred to the Training and General Base Depot at Tel el Kebir. He was promoted to temporary brigadier general on 16 March 1916 and appointed to command the Depot on 20 March 1916. During 1915 he had published The Heroic Serbians, for which he was awarded the Serbian Red Cross. When the Base moved to England, Browne went with it, taking command of the Training Depots in England on 14 June 1916. On 25 July 1916, his command was abolished and merged into AIF depots in the United Kingdom under Major General Newton James Moore. Browne took charge of the 2nd Command Depot at Weymouth, England; this unit was responsible for taking in men "unfit for service within six months" and therefore to be returned home.

On 12 October 1917, Browne was declared medically unfit and listed for return to Australia. He took a visit to France, and then left for Australia on 24 November 1917. On 10 February 1918, Browne was appointed to command the new Molonglo Concentration Camp near Canberra, where German internees were held. Browne was demobilized on 17 December 1918, and was formally retired on 20 October 1921 as an honorary major general.

== Post-war ==
For two years (1921–1922) Browne was State president of the Queensland branch of the Returned Sailors and Soldiers Imperial League of Australia. From 1925 to 1927, he contributed weekly articles to the Courier on his memories of people and events in 19th century Queensland. These were collected and published as A Journalist's Memories in 1927. The book is considered a reliable source of much information on the history and legends of Queensland.

== Personal ==
In 1881 Browne moved to Brisbane and married Violet Edith Fanny Sutton of Maryborough on 13 October. She died soon afterwards. On 7 August 1889 he had married Catherine Fraser Munro (d.1942), a noted musician and amateur actress. He had been interested primarily in pastimes like polo, shooting and fishing, but henceforth shared wide cultural interests with his wife.

He died, childless, in Brisbane on 9 November 1943, and was cremated.

== Publications ==
- Romances of goldfield and bush by R. Spencer Browne, London : Gordon and Gotch, 1890.
- The heroic Serbians : an appeal for help by Spencer Browne, Weymouth : Sherren, 1916, 1917, 1918.
- A Journalist's Memories by Spencer Browne, Brisbane : Read Press, 1927.
- The men of Queensland / Stanley Bruce Kennard: notes and recollections by Spencer Browne, Brisbane : H.J. Diddams, 1927.
- The sheep industry by Spencer Browne, Brisbane, 1942.
- Brisbane Theatre of the Old Days by Reginald Spencer Browne, in In The Early Days by J.J. Knight, n.d.
- Foundation of the Brisbane Courier by Reginald Spencer Browne, n.d.

== Manuscripts ==
- George Essex Evans: an appreciation by Spencer Browne, 1931. "Address delivered at Essex Evans Memorial, Toowoomba, 18 June 1931."
- Songs of the sixties by Spencer Browne, [1940–41?]. "A lecture delivered at...on...with musical accompaniments provided by Mrs Spencer Browne."

== See also ==
- List of Australian generals
