= Australian Mounted Division =

Imperial Mounted Division Australian Mounted Division
- Active: January 1917 – May 1919
- Country: Australia; United Kingdom; France; New Zealand
- Type: Division
- Role: Mounted infantry Australian light horse Yeomanry cavalry
- Part of: Desert Column; Desert Mounted Corps
- Anniversaries: 31 October Beersheba Day
- Equipment: Horse rifle and bayonet (Yeomanry armed with swords) 1916–1918. After the Yeomanry were sent to the Western Front, from mid-1918 a sword was added to the Light Horse along with Mixte de Cavalerie du Lavant Regiment
- Engagements: First World War: Sinai and Palestine campaign See battles section for more information

Commanders
- Commander: Henry Hodgson

The Australian Mounted Division originally formed as the Imperial Mounted Division in January 1917, was a mounted infantry, light horse and yeomanry division. The division was formed in Egypt, and along with the Anzac Mounted Division formed part of Desert Column, Egyptian Expeditionary Force in World War I. The division was originally made up of the Australian 3rd Light Horse Brigade, (formerly Anzac Mounted Division) the reconstituted 4th Light Horse Brigade, and two British yeomanry brigades; the 5th Mounted Brigade and 6th Mounted Brigade.

== History ==
=== Formation ===
The Imperial Mounted Division was formed in Egypt in 1917 by bringing together two Australian Light Horse brigades, two British Yeomanry brigades, and a British horse artillery brigade (Note: The basic organic unit of the Royal Artillery was, and is, the Battery. When grouped together they formed brigades, in the same way that infantry battalions or cavalry regiments were grouped together in brigades. At the outbreak of World War I, a field artillery brigade of headquarters (4 officers, 37 other ranks), three batteries (5 and 193 each), and a brigade ammunition column (4 and 154) had a total strength just under 800 so was broadly comparable to an infantry battalion (just over 1,000) or a cavalry regiment (about 550). Like an infantry battalion, an artillery brigade was usually commanded by a Lieutenant-Colonel. Artillery brigades were redesignated as regiments in 1938. Note that the battery strength refers to a battery of six guns; a four-gun battery would be about two thirds of this; a brigade of four four-gun batteries would be approximately the same strength as a brigade of three six-gun batteries.) (four batteries). These units were:

- The 3rd Light Horse Brigade was formed in Australia in October 1914 with the 8th, 9th, and 10th Light Horse Regiments and was posted to Egypt in March 1915. It was dismounted and served in Gallipoli from May to December attached to the New Zealand and Australian Division (notably the Battle of Sari Bair). It joined the ANZAC Mounted Division when it was formed in March 1916 and saw action with it at the battles of Romani and Magdhaba. It joined the division on formation in January 1917; it was replaced in the ANZAC Mounted Division by the British 22nd Mounted Brigade.
- The 4th Light Horse Brigade was formed in Australia in February 1915 with the 11th, 12th, and 13th Light Horse Regiments and was posted to Egypt in July 1915. The brigade was broken up: the 11th Light Horse Regiment was dismounted and served in Gallipoli as reinforcements to other regiments; the 12th Light Horse Regiment was dismounted and attached to the 3rd Light Horse Brigade in Gallipoli (August – December 1915) and 2nd Light Horse Brigade in Egypt (April 1915 – January 1917); and the 13th Light Horse Regiment remained mounted and joined the 2nd Australian Division. The brigade was reformed in January 1917 – with the 4th Light Horse Regiment in place of the 13th – and joined the division on formation.
- The 5th Mounted Brigade was formed as part of the Territorial Force in 1908 as the 1st South Midland Mounted Brigade with three yeomanry regiments: the Warwickshire Yeomanry, the Royal Gloucestershire Hussars and the Queen's Own Worcestershire Hussars. Shortly after the outbreak of war, it was assigned to the 2nd Mounted Division and moved to Egypt in April 1915. It was dismounted in August 1915 and took part in the Gallipoli Campaign as 1st Mounted Brigade, notably the Battle of Scimitar Hill. Due to losses and wastage during August 1915, it formed a battalion sized unit – 1st South Midland Regiment – in 1st Composite Mounted Brigade. It returned to Egypt in December where it was reformed and remounted. The 2nd Mounted Division was broken up in January 1916 and it served as Corps Troops from 21 January 1916 (numbered as 5th Mounted Brigade from April). It joined the division on formation.
- The 6th Mounted Brigade was likewise formed as part of the Territorial Force in 1908 as the 2nd South Midland Mounted Brigade with three yeomanry regiments: the Royal Buckinghamshire Hussars, the Berkshire Yeomanry and the Queen's Own Oxfordshire Hussars. On 19 September 1914, the Queen's Own Oxfordshire Hussars was posted to the BEF, joining the 4th Cavalry Brigade in France. The Queen's Own Dorset Yeomanry joined in the same month to replace them. The brigade's early service was identical to the 5th Mounted Brigade until January 1916 when it joined the Western Frontier Force. It joined the division on formation.
- XIX Brigade, Royal Horse Artillery (T.F.) was formed for the division in January 1917 with four British Territorial Force horse artillery batteries: the 1/1st Berkshire and 1/1st Nottinghamshire Batteries of the Royal Horse Artillery, and 1/A and 1/B Batteries of the Honourable Artillery Company. All four batteries had originally gone out to Egypt with the 2nd Mounted Division in April 1915, but did not proceed to Gallipoli with the division. Instead, they variously served on the Suez Canal Defences, as part of the Western Frontier Force in the Senussi Campaign, or in Aden where 1/B Battery HAC and 1/1st Berkshire RHA fought a sharp action at Sheikh Othman that removed the Turkish threat to Aden for the rest of the war. They rejoined 2nd Mounted Division on its return from Gallipoli in December 1915, however, the dismemberment of the division began almost immediately as units were posted to the Western Frontier Force, Suez Canal Defences or to various other commands. Initially, each battery was equipped with four Ehrhardt 15-pounder guns but were re-equipped with more modern 18 pounders (four per battery) in time for the First Battle of Gaza (26 – 27 March 1917). In practice, the batteries were tactically attached to the mounted brigades, for example, 1/1st Nottinghamshire RHA to the 3rd Light Horse Brigade and 1/A Battery HAC to the 4th Light Horse Brigade.

The division was also provided with support units, mostly assigned or attached directly to the brigades, but including an engineer squadron, a signals squadron, and train.

== Service history ==
The division joined the Desert Column alongside the ANZAC Mounted Division.

During the First Battle of Gaza, the division (as the Imperial Mounted Division) provided protection from counter-attack on the eastern flank while the main infantry assault was underway. The brigades became the rearguard during the withdrawal from Gaza after the attack was called off.

== Battles ==
The division served in the Sinai and Palestine Campaign from formation through to the end of the First World War including

- First Battle of Gaza (26 and 27 March 1917)
- Second Battle of Gaza (17 – 19 April)
- Third Battle of Gaza
  - Battle of Beersheba (31 October)
  - El Maghar (13 and 14 November)
- Defence against counter-attacks before Jerusalem (27 November – 30 December)
- Second Trans-Jordan Raid (30 April – 4 May 1918)
- The Final Offensive
  - Battle of Samakh (25 September)
  - Capture of Damascus (1 October)

== Orders of battle ==
Imperial Mounted Division – January 1917
On formation in Egypt in January 1917, the division commanded the following units. British units and formations are shown in italics.
3rd Light Horse Brigade: 8th Light Horse Regiment; 9th Light Horse Regiment; 10th Light Horse Regiment; 3rd Machine Gun Squadron (Note: Each machine gun squadron was equipped with twelve Vickers machine guns.); 3rd Signal Troop	Divisional troops: Artillery; XIX Brigade, Royal Horse Artillery (T.F.) (Note: Each battery was equipped with four 18 pounders.); 1/1st Nottinghamshire Royal Horse Artillery (RHA) (Note: Attached to the 3rd Light Horse Brigade.); 1/A Battery, Honourable Artillery Company (HAC) (Note: Attached to the 4th Light Horse Brigade.); 1/B Battery, Honourable Artillery Company (Note: Attached to the 5th Mounted Brigade.); 1/1st Berkshire Royal Horse Artillery (Note: Attached to the 6th Mounted Brigade.); XIX RHA Brigade Ammunition Column; Engineers; Imperial Mounted Division Field Squadron; 3rd Field Troop; 4th Field Troop; 6th Field Troop; 7th Field Troop; Signals; Imperial Mounted Division Signal Squadron; Medical; 3rd Light Horse Field Ambulance; 4th Light Horse Field Ambulance; 8th Sanitary Section; Mobile Veterinary Sections; 8th Mobile Veterinary Section; 9th Mobile Veterinary Section; Imperial Mounted Division Train; 3rd Supply Section (Note: Originally the 3rd Light Horse Brigade Train, designated 3rd Supply Section from February 1916 and 35th Company, Australian Army Service Corps from February 1917.); 4th Supply Section (Note: Originally the 4th Light Horse Brigade Train, designated 4th Supply Section from February 1916 and 36th Company, Australian Army Service Corps from February 1917.); 27th Depot Unit of Supply
4th Light Horse Brigade: 4th Light Horse Regiment; 11th Light Horse Regiment; 12th Light Horse Regiment; 4th Machine Gun Squadron; 4th Signal Troop
5th Mounted Brigade: 1/1st Warwickshire Yeomanry; 1/1st Royal Gloucestershire Hussars; 1/1st Queen's Own Worcestershire Hussars; 16th Machine Gun Squadron; 5th Mounted Brigade Signal Troop; 5th Mounted Brigade Field Ambulance, RAMC; 5th Mounted Brigade Mobile Veterinary Section
6th Mounted Brigade: 1/1st Royal Buckinghamshire Hussars; 1/1st Queen's Own Dorset Yeomanry; 1/1st Berkshire Yeomanry; 17th Machine Gun Squadron; 6th Mounted Brigade Signal Troop; 5th Mounted Brigade Field Ambulance, RAMC; 5th Mounted Brigade Mobile Veterinary Section

Australian Mounted Division – July 1918
By July 1918, the division had been redesignated and reorganized almost entirely with Australian units. Non-Australian units and formations are shown in italics.
3rd Light Horse Brigade: 8th Light Horse Regiment; 9th Light Horse Regiment; 10th Light Horse Regiment; 3rd Machine Gun Squadron (Note: Each machine gun squadron was equipped with twelve Vickers machine guns.); 3rd Signal Troop	Divisional troops: Artillery; XIX Brigade, Royal Horse Artillery (T.F.) (Note: Each battery was re-equipped with four 13 pounders.); 1/1st Nottinghamshire Royal Horse Artillery (RHA) (Note: Attached to the 3rd Light Horse Brigade.); 1/A Battery, Honourable Artillery Company (HAC) (Note: Attached to the 4th Light Horse Brigade.); 1/B Battery, Honourable Artillery Company (Note: Attached to the 5th Light Horse Brigade.); XIX RHA Brigade Ammunition Column; Engineers; 2nd Field Squadron; Signals; 2nd Signal Squadron; Medical; 3rd Light Horse Field Ambulance; 4th Light Horse Field Ambulance; 5th Light Horse Field Ambulance; 8th Sanitary Section; Mobile Veterinary Sections; 8th Mobile Veterinary Section; 9th Mobile Veterinary Section; 10th Mobile Veterinary Section; Australian Mounted Division Train; 35th Company, Australian Army Service Corps; 36th Company, Australian Army Service Corps; 37th Company, Australian Army Service Corps (Note: Originally the 5th Light Horse Brigade Train, designated 37th Company, Australian Army Service Corps from July 1918.); 38th Company, Australian Army Service Corps; 27th Depot Unit of Supply
4th Light Horse Brigade: 4th Light Horse Regiment; 11th Light Horse Regiment; 12th Light Horse Regiment; 4th Machine Gun Squadron; 4th Signal Troop
5th Light Horse Brigade: 14th Light Horse Regiment; 15th Light Horse Regiment; 1er Regiment Mixte de Cavalerie du Lavant (Note: Made up of two squadrons of the 1^{er} Régiment de Spahis and two squadrons of the 4^{e} Regiment de Marche Chasseurs d'Afrique.); 2nd New Zealand Machine Gun Squadron; 5th Signal Troop

== See also ==
- Military history of Australia during World War I

== Bibliography ==
- Becke, Archibald F. (1936). Order of Battle of Divisions Part 2A. The Territorial Force Mounted Divisions and the 1st-Line Territorial Force Divisions (42–56). London: HMSO. OCLC 4405016.
- Clarke, Dale (2004). British Artillery 1914–19 Field Army Artillery. Vol. 94 of New Vanguard Series. Oxford: Osprey Publishing. ISBN 1-84176-688-7.
- Falls, Cyril; MacMunn, George (1930). Military Operations Egypt & Palestine From the Outbreak of War With Germany to June 1917. Official History of the Great War Based on Official Documents by Direction of the Historical Section of the Committee of Imperial Defence. Vol. 1. London: HM Stationery Office. OCLC 610273484.
- Farndale, General Sir Martin (1988). The Forgotten Fronts and the Home Base, 1914–18. History of the Royal Regiment of Artillery. Woolwich: The Royal Artillery Institution. ISBN 1-870114-05-1.
- Frederick, J.B.M. (1984). Lineage Book of British Land Forces 1660–1978. Wakefield, Yorkshire: Microform Academic Publishers. ISBN 1-85117-009-X.
- James, Brigadier E.A. (1978). British Regiments 1914–18. London: Samson Books. ISBN 0-906304-03-2.
- Jones, Ian (1987). The Australian Light Horse. Australians at War. Australia: Time-Life Books. OCLC 18459444.
- Massey, William T. (1920). Allenby's Final Triumph. London: Constable & Co.
- Perry, F.W. (1992). Order of Battle of Divisions Part 5A. The Divisions of Australia, Canada and New Zealand and those in East Africa. Newport: Ray Westlake Military Books. ISBN 1-871167-25-6.
- Perry, F.W. (1993). Order of Battle of Divisions Part 5B. Indian Army Divisions. Newport: Ray Westlake Military Books. ISBN 1-871167-23-X.
- Preston, R.M.P. (1921). The Desert Mounted Corps: An Account of the Cavalry Operations in Palestine and Syria 1917–1918. London: Constable & Co. OCLC 3900439.
- Westlake, Ray (1992). British Territorial Units 1914–18. Osprey Publishing. ISBN 978-1-85532-168-7.
