= 5th Light Horse Brigade =

Formation of the Australian Army

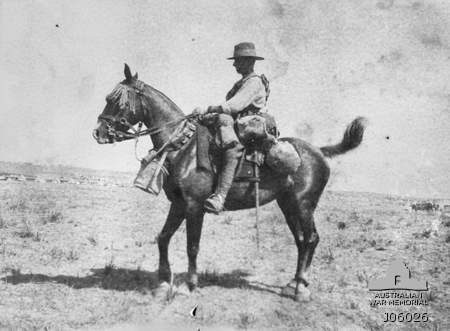
- A trooper of the 15th Light Horse Regiment
- Active: 1902–1921
- Country: Australia; France
- Allegiance: Australian Crown
- Branch: Australian Army
- Type: Mounted Infantry
- Size: Brigade
- Part of: Australian Mounted Division
- Equipment: Horse
- Engagements: Sinai and Palestine campaign: Battle of Megiddo (1918); Battle of Sharon; Battle of Tulkarm

Insignia
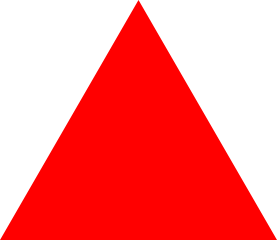
- Unit colour patch

The 5th Light Horse Brigade was a mounted infantry brigade of the First Australian Imperial Force (AIF) that served during World War I. The brigade was initially formed as a part-time militia formation in the early 1900s in Queensland. During World War I, the brigade was formed in Palestine in July 1918 following the disbandment of the Imperial Camel Corps. At this time, the brigade consisted of two Australian Light Horse regiments and a French cavalry regiment, and was supported by British and New Zealand artillery and machine gun troops. It served in the Middle Eastern theatre of World War I in the Sinai and Palestine Campaign as part of the Australian Mounted Division, but only saw limited operations before the war ended, taking part in the capture of Damascus in September and October 1918. After the war, the AIF light horse regiments were demobilised and disbanded; however, the brigade briefly existed as a part-time militia formation in Victoria until 1921 when its regiments were reorganised into cavalry brigades.

== History ==
=== Early formation ===
The 5th Light Horse Brigade was initially raised as part of the militia in the early 1900s, being formed sometime between 1902 and 1905. That formation was raised in Queensland, and consisted of only two light horse regiments – the 13th and 14th – both of which were part of the Queensland Mounted Infantry. The 13th had depots in Brisbane and its surrounds, spread out to Laidley and Gatton, while the 14th was based around Toowoomba, Warwick, Stanthorpe, Dalby, Roma and other smaller centres. In 1910, the brigade was reorganised when the 15th Light Horse Regiment (Queensland Mounted Infantry) was added. This unit was based further north around Rockhampton, Bowen, Mackay, Townsville and other smaller depots.

By 1912, however, an Army wide reorganisation resulted in the brigade's constituent regiments being redesignated. The 13th Light Horse became the 2nd Light Horse Regiment (QMI), the 14th became the 3rd (Darling Downs) Light Horse Regiment and the 15th was split to provide troops for the 1st (Central Queensland) Light Horse Regiment, 27th (North Queensland) Light Horse Regiment and 4th (Hunter River Lancers) Light Horse Regiment; the last of these was based in New South Wales. Most of these regiments were reallocated to the re-constituted 1st Light Horse Brigade, with the 27th becoming a divisional cavalry regiment. The 5th Light Horse Brigade designation was then re-used for a formation based in Victoria, consisting of the 13th (Gippsland) Light Horse Regiment, the 15th (Victorian Mounted Rifles) Light Horse Regiment and the 16th (Indi) Light Horse Regiment.

=== World War I ===
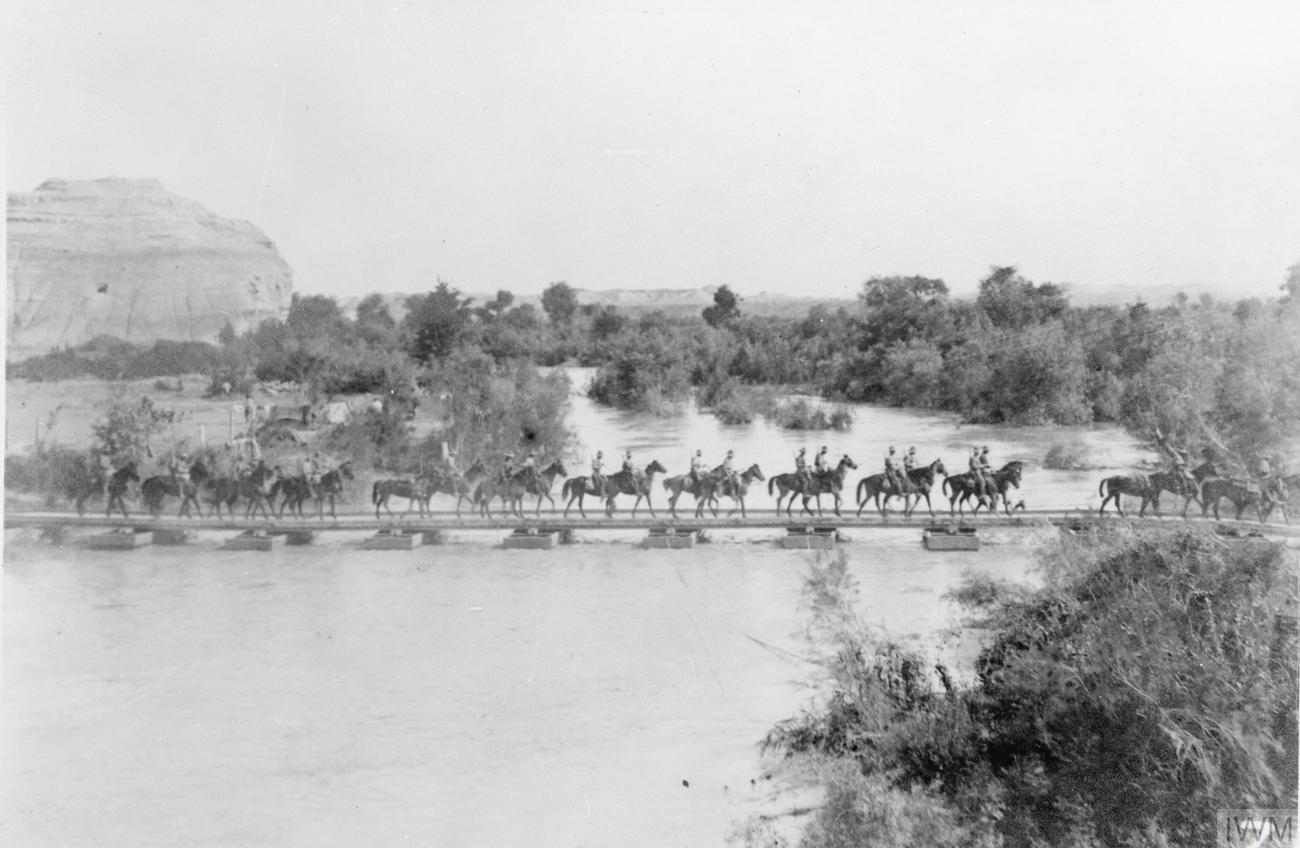
The 5th Light Horse Brigade crosses the Ghoraniyeh bridge, Jordan River, April 1918, during the Sinai and Palestine Campaign

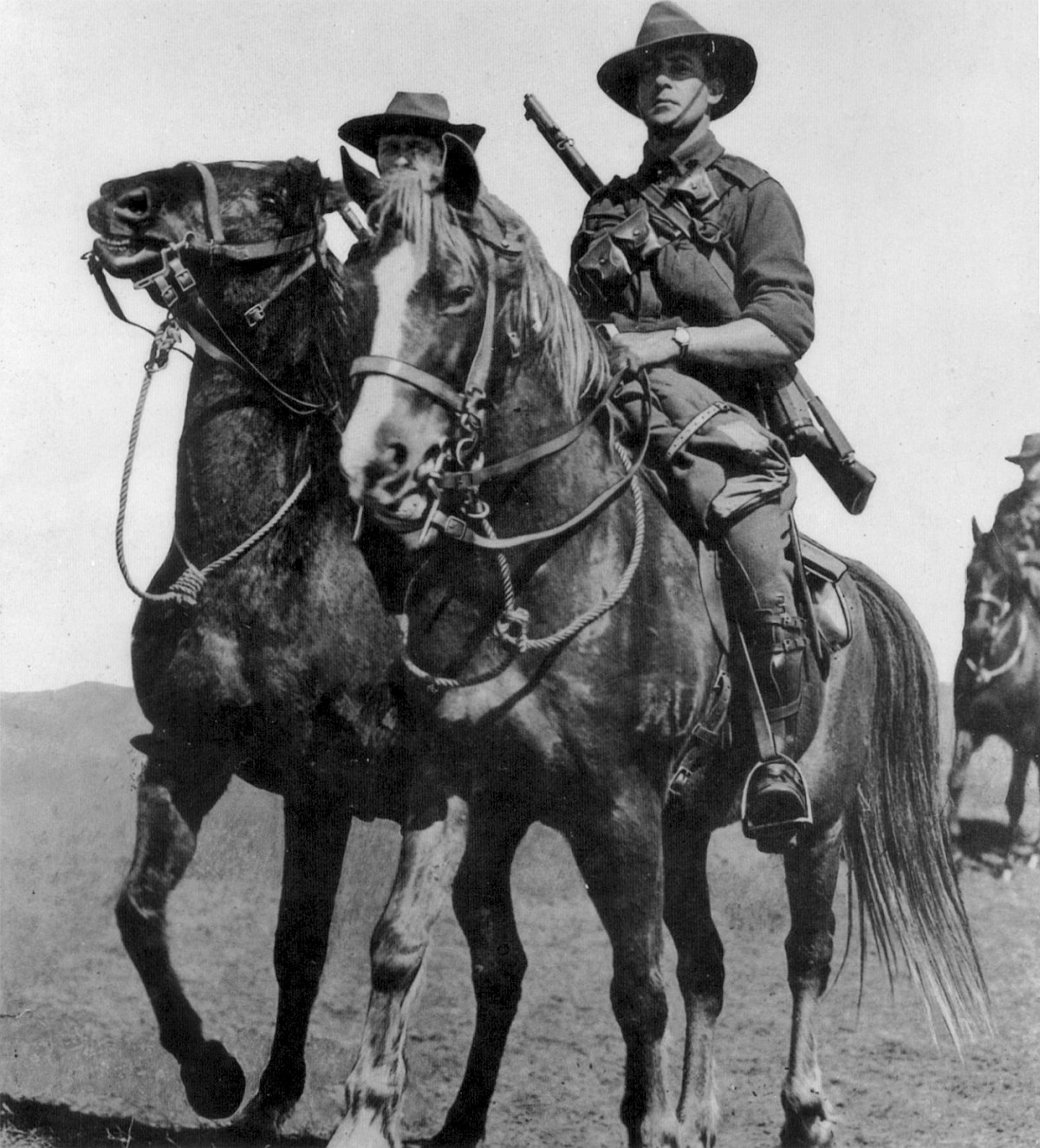
The Australian Light Horse during World War I

At the outbreak of the war August 1914 the Australian Government decided to raise the Australian Imperial Force (AIF) consisting of 20,000 troops comprising an infantry division and a light horse brigade of three regiments to be used at the discretion of Britain. These regiments were raised from volunteers for overseas service, as the provisions of the Defence Act did not allow conscripts to be deployed overseas. Nevertheless, many of the recruits were drawn from the various militia light horse formations created as a consequence of the Kitchener Report 1910 and the introduction of Universal Training, although they were assigned to freshly raised units that were separate to the light horse regiments raised as part of the militia. Initial enlistments outstripped expectations and, as a result, a total of three light horse brigades as well as two divisional cavalry regiments were formed in the early part of the war. Later, this was expanded to include a fourth light horse brigade, although this was broken up in mid-1915 to provide reinforcements to the troops deployed to Gallipoli and was not re-raised until early 1917. After Gallipoli, the Australian light horse formations were used in the Middle Eastern theatre of World War I in the Sinai and Palestine Campaign.

The 5th Light Horse Brigade was raised as an AIF formation late in the war, coming into being in Palestine in mid-1918 as part of the expansion and reorganisation of the Desert Mounted Corps. This expansion was made possible by the release of Indian cavalry troops from service in France and the disbandment of the Imperial Camel Corps, which resulted in enough Australian troops to raise several new light horse regiments. Upon formation the brigade was commanded by Brigadier General George Macarthur-Onslow and consisted of two Australian Light Horse Regiments – the 14th and 15th – as well as a French cavalry regiment and a New Zealand machine gun squadron. The brigade's artillery support was provided by the British who assigned B Battery, Honourable Artillery Company.

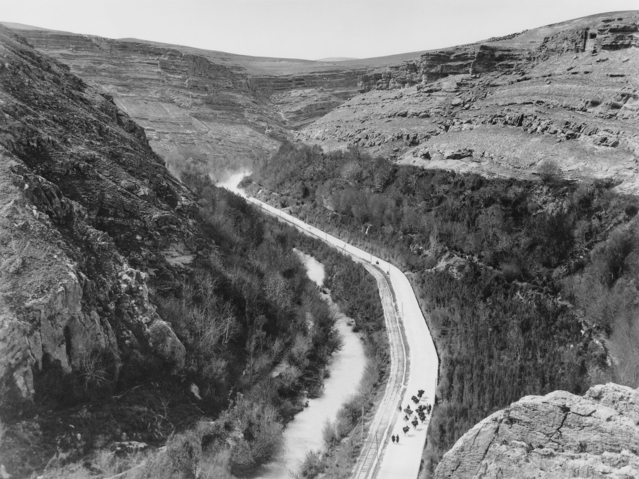
Barada Gorge where the 5th Light Horse Brigade attacked withdrawing Ottoman and German troops on 30 September 1918

For the offensive in Palestine, the brigade was assigned to the Australian Mounted Division. Prior to their commitment to operations, the troopers were converted from cameleers and were issued swords and received cavalry training. Having been formed late in the war, the 5th Light Horse Brigade's involvement in combat operations was limited to the final offensive of the war, which began with the Battle of Megiddo in late September 1918. During this offensive, the brigade took part in the Battle of Sharon and Battle of Tulkarm, taking a large number of prisoners to the west of the Samaria Ranges. During operations to secure Damascus, the brigade took up positions overlooking the Barada Gorge, helping to cut off withdrawing Ottoman and German troops, and inflicting heavy casualties on them during an ambush on 30 September. The brigade then spent the night there in freezing conditions before elements entered Damascus on 1 October. For the remainder of the month, it was engaged in minor mopping up and patrol operations before joining the final stage of the campaign, which saw the brigade begin the advance towards Aleppo. The advance was short lived, as on 30 October the Ottomans surrendered, and the Armistice of Mudros came into effect, bringing an end to the fighting in the theatre.

=== Disbandment and perpetuation ===
In the final months of 1918, the demobilisation process began, and the brigade spent Christmas around Homs, in Syria. The brigade concentrated with the Australian Mounted Division around Tripoli, before sailing to Egypt in mid-March 1919, establishing camp around Moascar. In late March 1919, elements of the brigade were used to suppress the Egyptian revolt, undertaking patrols and carrying out internal security duties into May. Afterwards, the individual regiments and brigade headquarters returned stores and equipment and embarked for Australia around July 1919. The main body departed Suez on HMAT Dongola and the rear details followed on HMAT Burma, after which they were disbanded.

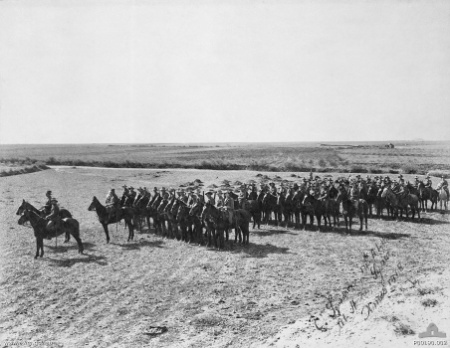
14th Light Horse Regiment on parade at Homs, Syria on Christmas Day 1918

Throughout late 1918 and early 1919, the process of demobilising the AIF continued, although this would not be complete until 1921. At this time, the militia formations that had remained in Australia for home service were reorganised to realign them with the recruitment areas that had contributed to the AIF regiments, and to replicate the AIF's organisational structure and designations. These formations had continued to exist alongside the AIF in Australia, albeit largely on paper only as they had been reduced significantly due to large-scale enlistment in the AIF, and a lack of funds and resources for training. By 1919, a 5th Light Horse Brigade had been formed in the militia, consisting of 13th, 14th and 20th Light Horse Regiments, which were based in Gippsland, Seymour and Shepparton in Victoria.

In the first couple of years after the war, plans were made to reorganise the home forces to meet the needs of peacetime while providing a strong base upon which to mobilise if necessary. By 1921, when the AIF was officially disbanded, plans were approved to raise two cavalry divisions, each of three brigades, utilising a mix of voluntary enlistment and compulsory service. At this time, the brigades were designated as cavalry brigades, rather than light horse brigades, and the 5th Light Horse Brigade ceased to exist. Within the new structure, the 13th and 20th Light Horse Regiments became part of the 3rd Cavalry Brigade, based in Victoria, while the 14th Light Horse Regiment designation was re-used for a Queensland-based unit that became part of the 1st Cavalry Brigade. At the same time, the 5th Cavalry Brigade was raised around Warrnambool, Bendigo and Ballarat consisting of the 4th, 17th and 19th Light Horse Regiments.

== Commander ==
During World War I, the brigade was commanded by the following officers:

- Brigadier General George Macarthur-Onslow

== Composition ==
During World War I, the brigade consisted of the following units and subunits:

- 14th Light Horse Regiment
- 15th Light Horse Regiment
- 1er Régiment Mixte de Marche de Cavalerie du Levant (the cavalry element of the overall Détachement Français de Palestine et de Syrie), composed of two squadrons of French Chasseurs d'Afrique and one squadron of Spahis, all three squadrons having arrived at Port Said on 19 March 1918. A fourth squadron and a machine gun platoon were despatched from the port of Bizerte, but their boat was torpedoed with the loss of all horses.
- 2nd New Zealand Machine Gun Squadron
- 5th Signal Troop
- B Battery, Honourable Artillery Company attached

== See also ==
- 1st Light Horse Brigade
- 2nd Light Horse Brigade
- 3rd Light Horse Brigade
- 4th Light Horse Brigade
