= 5th Light Horse Regiment (Australia) =

- 5th Light Horse Regiment hat badge
- Active: 1914–1919; 1921–1943
- Country: Australia
- Branch: Australian Army
- Type: Mounted infantry
- Size: Regiment
- Part of: 2nd Light Horse Brigade
- Engagements: First World War: North African Campaign; Gallipoli campaign; Sinai and Palestine Campaign

Insignia
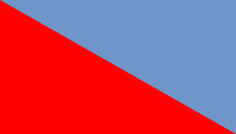
- Unit colour patch

The 5th Light Horse Regiment was a mounted infantry regiment of the Australian Army during the First World War. The regiment was raised in August 1914, and assigned to the 2nd Light Horse Brigade. The regiment fought against the forces of the Ottoman Empire, in Egypt, at Gallipoli, on the Sinai Peninsula, and in Palestine and Jordan. After the armistice the regiment eventually returned to Australia in March 1919. For its role in the war the regiment was awarded sixteen battle honours.

During the inter-war years, the regiment was re-raised as a part-time unit based in the Wide Bay–Burnett region of Queensland, adopting the designation of the "Wide Bay and Burnett Light Horse (QMI)". It was later converted to a motor regiment during the early years of the Second World War but it was disbanded in mid-1943 without having been deployed overseas.

== History ==
=== Formation ===
The 5th Light Horse Regiment was raised in September 1914 as part of the all volunteer Australian Imperial Force, at Brisbane from volunteers from Queensland, and was assigned to the 2nd Light Horse Brigade. Light horse regiments normally comprised twenty-five officers and 497 other ranks serving in three squadrons, each of six troops. Each troop was divided into eight sections, of four men each. In action one man of each section, was nominated as a horse holder reducing the regiment's rifle strength by a quarter.

All Australian Light Horse regiments used cavalry unit designations, but were mounted infantry, and mounted exclusively on the Australian Waler horse.

=== Gallipoli ===
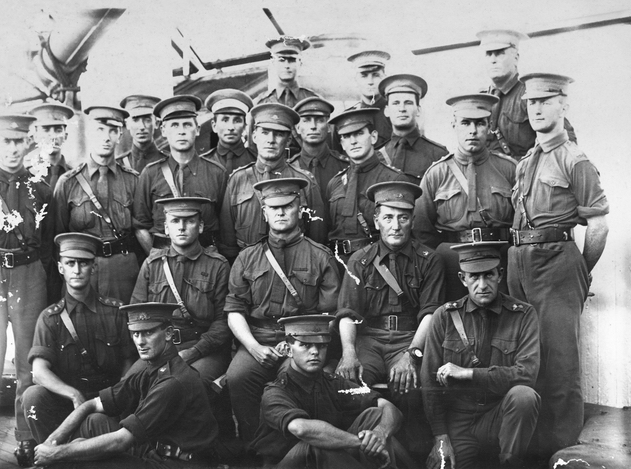
A group of officers of the 5th Light Horse Regiment en route to the Middle East

On 21 December 1914, the 5th Light Horse Regiment left Sydney for Egypt, arriving on 1 February 1915. When the Australian infantry units were dispatched to Gallipoli, it was thought the terrain was unsuitable for mounted troops, and the light horse regiments remained in Egypt. However, heavy casualties amongst the Australian infantry resulted in the deployment of the 2nd Light Horse Brigade as dismounted reinforcements in May 1915. On arrival, the regiment was attached to the 1st Division, who by this stage of the campaign were fighting a defensive battle around the beachhead that had been established around Anzac Cove. The regiment was involved in several small-scale attacks. Its commanding officer, Lieutenant Colonel Hubert Harris was killed in action on 31 July 1915. The regiment was withdrawn in December 1915 as part of the Allied evacuation from the Gallipoli Peninsula.

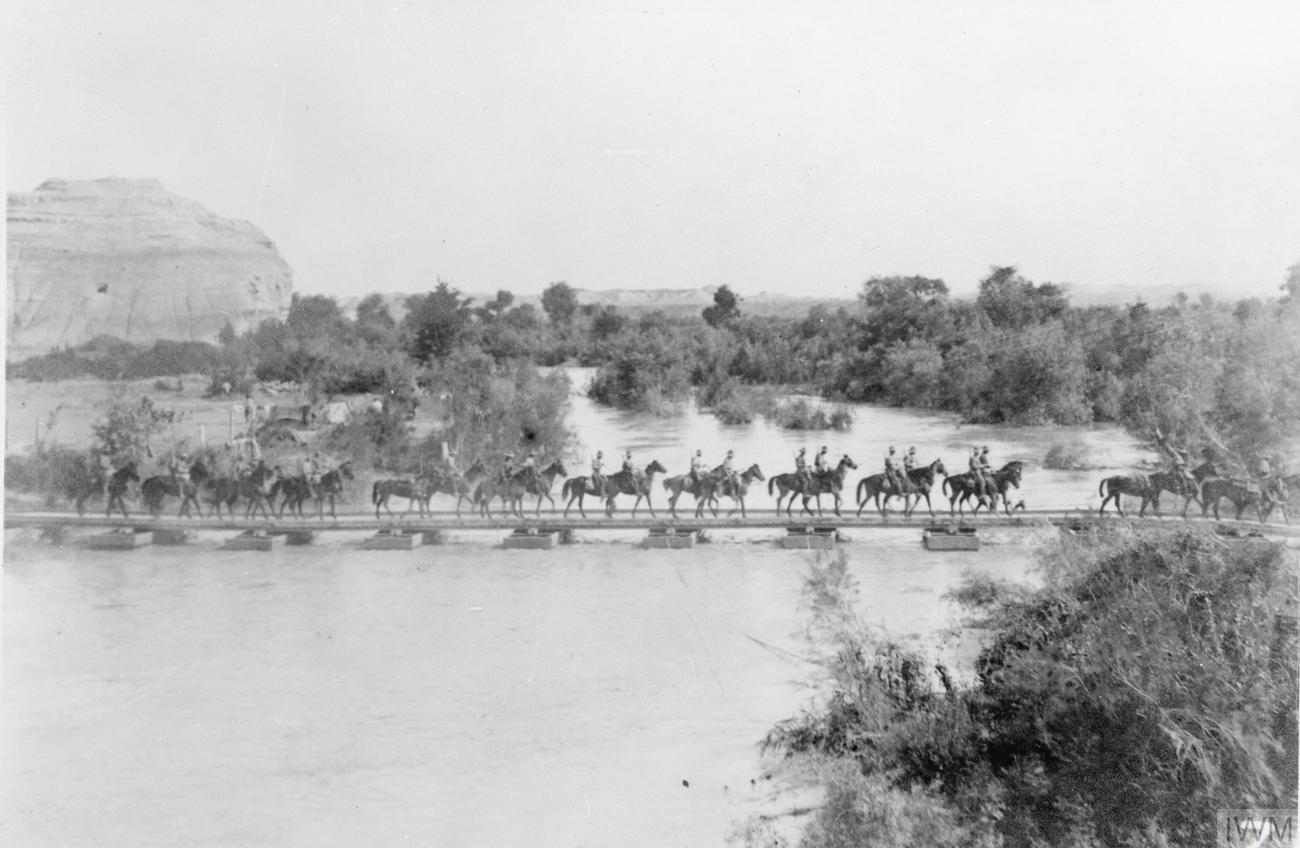
5th Light Horse crossing the pontoon bridge at the Ghoraniye Bridgehead

=== Sinai and Palestine Campaign ===
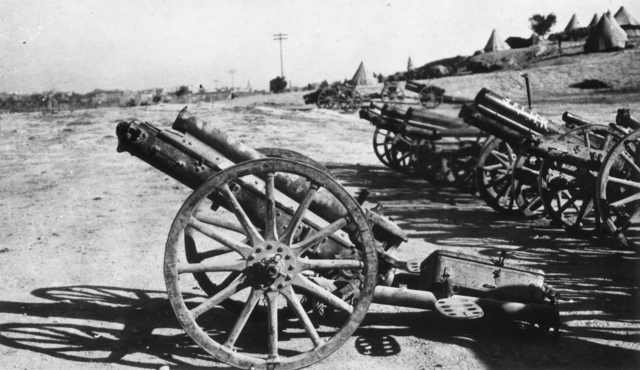
Turkish guns captured by the regiment October 1916

After arriving back in Egypt, the regiment still with the 2nd Light Horse Brigade, was assigned to the ANZAC Mounted Division. Their first action was to defend the Suez Canal from an Ottoman incursion through the Sinai desert. The regiment's role was mainly patrolling the desert, and in August following the Battle of Romani, they were involved in several small battles.

In December 1916, the ANZAC Mounted Division moved into Palestine, during which the regiment carried out patrols and raided Ottoman positions. On 27 March 1917, the regiment fought in the First Battle of Gaza, and after attacking the town from the rear, was fighting through the town when ordered to withdraw. They then fought in the unsuccessful Second Battle of Gaza and the Third Battle of Gaza, when the town was finally captured.

The regiment was then involved in following up the retreating Ottoman forces into Palestine. In 1918, they were positioned on the River Jordan, fighting two small battles at Amman in February and Es Salt in April and May. The main British assault was on the coast, but the 5th Light Horse remained on the Jordan, attacking Amman in September. On 29 September, two of the regiment's squadrons accepted the surrender of 4,500 Ottoman soldiers. When the Armistice of Mudros was signed in October 1918, and the war in the Middle East ended, the regiment returned to Egypt, to assist in putting down a riot. Then, on 28 June 1919, the regiment sailed for Australia; their involvement in the war cost them 137 killed and 708 wounded.

=== Inter war years and subsequent service ===
In 1921, Australia's part-time military forces were re-organised to perpetuate the numerical designations of the AIF following its demobilisation. Through this process, the 5th Light Horse was re-raised as a Citizens Forces unit within the 1st Military District in the Wide Bay–Burnett region of Queensland. Adopting the designation of the "Wide Bay and Burnett Light Horse (QMI)", the re-raised unit drew lineage from the 1st (Central Queensland) Light Horse that had been formed in 1913 and which traced its origins back to the 13th Australian Light Horse Regiment (Queensland Mounted Infantry) that had been formed in 1903 as part of the amalgamation of Australia's colonial forces into the Australian Army after Federation.

This unit remained in existence throughout the inter-war years, and at the outbreak of the Second World War the regiment was assigned to the 11th Mixed Brigade, although it was later reassigned to the 1st Cavalry Brigade. In December 1941, it was converted into a motor regiment, adopting the designation of the "5th Motor Regiment (Wide Bay and Burnett Light Horse) (QMI)". In early 1943, the regiment was gazetted as an AIF unit after the majority of its personnel volunteered to serve outside of Australian territory, nevertheless, it did not serve overseas and, as part of a gradual demobilisation of the Australian Army, on 3 July 1943, it was disbanded without having seen operational service during the war.

== Battle honours ==
The 5th Light Horse Regiment received the following battle honours:

- ANZAC · Defence at ANZAC · Suvla · Sari Bair · Gallipoli 1915–1916 · Egypt 1915–1917 · Romani · Gaza-Beersheba · El Mughar · Nebi Samwill · Jerusalem · Jordan (Es Salt) · Jordan (Amman) · Megiddo · Nablus · Palestine 1917–1918.

== Commanding officers ==
The following officers commanded the 5th Light Horse Regiment during the First World War:

- Lieutenant Colonel Hubert Jennings Imrie Harris (killed in action at Gallipoli)
- Lieutenant Colonel Lachlan Chisholm Wilson
- Lieutenant Colonel Donald Charles Cameron
