= 1st Motor Brigade (Australia) =

Mounted formation of the Australian Army

- Active: 1921–1943
- Country: Australia
- Allegiance: Australian Crown
- Branch: Australian Army
- Type: Cavalry (1921–1942); Motorised infantry (1942–1943)
- Size: Brigade
- Part of: 1st Cavalry Division; 5th Division; I Corps; 1st Motor Division; 3rd Armoured Division

Insignia
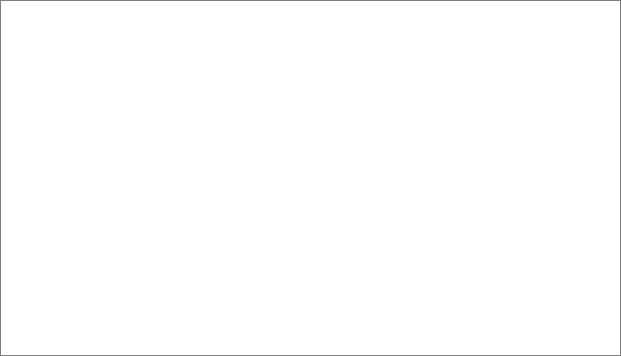
- Unit colour patch (1942)

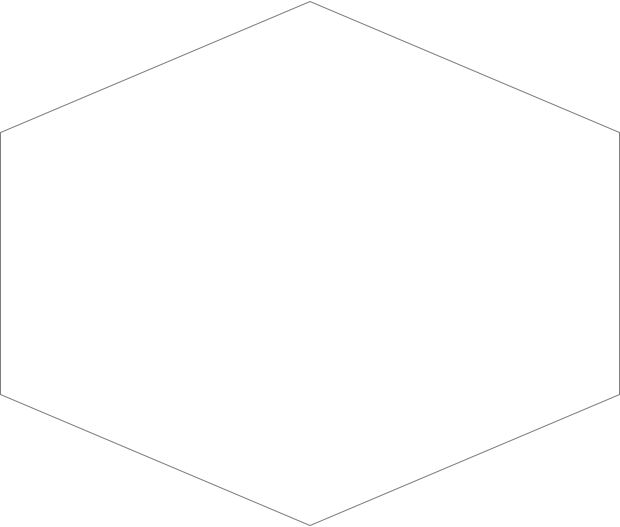
- (1943)

The 1st Motor Brigade was a formation of the Australian Army during the interwar years and the early part of World War II. Initially raised in 1921 as the 1st Cavalry Brigade in Queensland, it was a part time formation of the Militia. It consisted of three light horse regiments spread across several depots in the southeast part of the state. During World War II, the brigade was mobilized for defensive duties in December 1941, and assumed positions north of Brisbane to defend against a possible invasion. In early 1942, the brigade was converted into a motorized formation, and was redesignated as the 1st Motor Brigade. In July 1943, when the threat of invasion had passed, it was disbanded and its manpower reallocated to operational formations.

== History ==
The brigade was formed as a part time unit of the Militia in 1921 and was designated as the 1st Cavalry Brigade. Headquartered in Brisbane, Queensland, the brigade was raised from the previously existing 1st Light Horse Brigade. Upon establishment, the brigade consisted of three light horse regiments: the 5th, 11th and 14th. These were based in Gympie, Toowoomba and Ipswich. It formed part of the 1st Cavalry Division, which was headquartered in Sydney. By 1938, the brigade's three regiments had been transferred to the 11th Mixed Brigade, with the 2nd and 14th Light Horse Regiments being amalgamated. Plans drawn up before the war assigned the brigade a flank protection role to the north and south of Brisbane in the event of an invasion.

During World War II, the 1st Cavalry Brigade was mobilized for full time service following Japan's entry into the war in December 1941. At this time, the brigade's headquarters was located at Fortitude Valley, Brisbane; its constituent units were converted into motorised units at this time, as part of an effort to motorize or mechanize Australia's mounted forces in the early war years. The brigade consisted of the 5th Motor Regiment, the 11th Motor Regiment and the 2nd Reconnaissance Battalion at this time, and was spread between Gympie, Gatton, and Grovely. By February 1942, the brigade's headquarters had moved to Enoggera with the 5th and 11th Motor Regiments based around Buderim and Caloundra.

The brigade was converted into the 1st Motor Brigade in March – April 1942. After it was converted into a motor brigade, the brigade was reinforced by the 16th Motor Regiment, which was transferred to Gympie from New South Wales. At this time, the brigade was tasked with carrying out reconnaissance and defensive duties in the Bundaberg–Maroochy River region, in the event of a Japanese invasion. This resulted in brigade headquarters being moved to Cooroy and then Gympie in April and May. The brigade was assigned to the 5th Division, then transferred to the direct command of I Corps before later being transferred to the 1st Motor Division. In July 1942, the brigade's area of responsibility was widened to include Maryborough as part of a reorganization necessitated by the dispatch of the 7th Division to New Guinea to join the fighting along the Kokoda Track.

The brigade was transferred again in November 1942, to the 3rd Armoured Division, headquartered at Murgon; at this time, the brigade's main units were the 5th, 11th and 16th Motor Regiments. At the start of 1943, the 1st Motor Brigade moved to Goomeri. However, when the threat of invasion had passed, the brigade was disbanded in July 1943, having not seen any active service. The brigade's manpower was then reallocated to meet shortages in the Army's operational formations, with the volunteer Second Australian Imperial Force personnel being reassigned to several different infantry brigades, specifically the 18th and 21st, while headquarters staff were transferred to the 25th Infantry Brigade's headquarters.

== Brigade units ==
The following units served with the brigade during the war while it was a cavalry brigade:

- 5th Light Horse
- 11th Light Horse
- 2nd/14th Light Horse
- 2nd Light Horse
- 5th Motor Regiment
- 11th Motor Regiment
- 2nd Reconnaissance Battalion

The following units served with the brigade during the war following its conversion to a motor brigade:

- 2nd Reconnaissance Battalion
- 5th Motor Regiment
- 11th Motor Regiment
- 16th Motor Regiment
- 6th Anti-Tank Battery, Royal Australian Artillery
- 232nd Light Anti-Aircraft Battery, Royal Australian Artillery
- 6th Field Squadron, Royal Australian Engineers

== See also ==
- List of Australian Army brigades
