= Capture of Jenin =

Part of the Middle Eastern theatre of World War I

Coordinates: 32°27′42.51″N 35°18′4.88″E

- Part of the Middle Eastern theatre of World War I
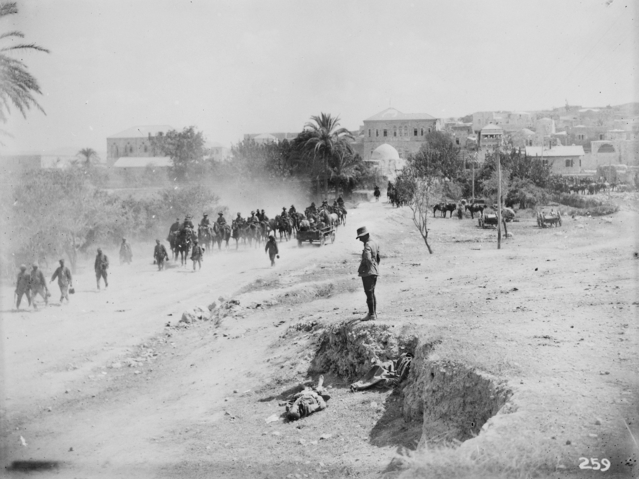
- Jenin on 21 September 1918
Date	20 September 1918
Location	Jenin, on the southern edge of the Esdraelon Plain (Jezreel Valley), at the foot of the Judean Hills
Result	British Empire victory

Belligerents
British Empire: Australia	Ottoman Empire; German Empire

Commanders and leaders
(United Kingdom of Great Britain and Ireland) Edmund Allenby (Australia) Harry Chauvel (Australia) Lachlan Wilson	(Ottoman Empire) Fevsi Pasha (German Empire) Otto Liman von Sanders

Units involved
Egyptian Expeditionary Force; Desert Mounted Corps; Australian Mounted Division	Yildirim Army Group; Seventh Army; Eighth Army

Casualties and losses
Unknown	8,000 prisoners

The Capture of Jenin occurred on 20 September 1918, during the Battle of Sharon which together with the Battle of Nablus formed the set piece Battle of Megiddo fought between 19 and 25 September during the last months of the Sinai and Palestine Campaign of World War I. During the cavalry phase of the Battle of Sharon carried out by the Desert Mounted Corps, the 3rd Light Horse Brigade, Australian Mounted Division attacked and captured the town of Jenin located on the southern edge of the Esdraelon Plain (also known as the Jezreel Valley and the plain of Armageddon) 40–50 miles (64–80 km) behind the front line in the Judean Hills. The Australian light horse captured about 2,000 prisoners, the main supply base and the ordnance depot of the Seventh and the Eighth Armies in and near the town. They also cut the main road from Nablus and a further 6,000 Ottoman Empire and German Empire prisoners, were subsequently captured as they attempted to retreat away from the Judean Hills.

The Egyptian Expeditionary Force (EEF) cavalry had ridden through a gap on the Mediterranean Sea coast, created by the infantry during the Battle of Tulkarm, to capture the two Ottoman armies' main lines of communication and supply north of the Judean Hills, while the infantry battles continued. On 20 September, the Desert Mounted Corps captured Afulah, Beisan and Jenin on the Esdrealon Plain. The next day the headquarters of the Seventh Army at Nablus, and the General Headquarters (GHQ) of the Yilderim Army Group at Nazareth, were both captured, while Haifa was captured two days later. During a subsequent early morning attack on 25 September, a German rearguard was captured during the Battle of Samakh, which ended the Battle of Sharon. During these operations the greater part of one Ottoman army was captured in the Judean Hills and at Jenin. These and other battles fought during the Battle of Megiddo including the Battle of Nablus and Third Transjordan attack, forced the retreating Ottoman Fourth, and remnants of the Seventh and the Eighth Armies, to the eastern side of the Jordan River. As they withdrew northwards towards Damascus they were pursued by the Desert Mounted Corps.

After the infantry established a gap in the Ottoman front line on the coast early on the morning of 19 September, the Australian Mounted Division's 3rd and 4th Light Horse Brigades (less the 5th Light Horse Brigade temporarily detached to the 60th Division) in reserve, followed the 4th Cavalry Division north on the Plain of Sharon and across the Mount Carmel Range, by the Musmus Pass, to Lejjun on the Esdrealon Plain. While the 4th Light Horse Brigade remained to garrison Lejjun and provide various guards for artillery, supplies, and corps headquarters before being ordered to capture Samakh, the 3rd Light Horse Brigade advanced to Jenin, where the 9th and 10th Light Horse captured the town after a brief fire fight. Subsequently, these two regiments captured some 8,000 Ottoman soldiers, who had been attempting to retreat northwards out of the Judean Hills, during the night of 20/21 September. The outnumbered Australian Light Horsemen were reinforced as quickly as possible, and the majority of the prisoners were marched back into holding camps, near Lejjun in the morning. The 3rd Light Horse Brigade remained in the area to garrison Jenin until they advanced to capture Tiberias on 25 September 1918, before participating in the pursuit to Damascus.

== Background ==
Following the Capture of Jericho in February, the commander of the Egyptian Expeditionary Force (EEF), General Edmund Allenby ordered the occupation of the Jordan Valley. In March–April and April–May 1918, the First and the Second Transjordan attacks took place, while the front line across the Judean Hills to the Mediterranean Sea was defended. During this time, three-quarters of the British infantry and yeomanry cavalry regiments were redeployed to the Western Front to counter Ludendorff's German spring offensive. They were replaced by British India Army infantry and cavalry which required a reorganisation. These newly arrived soldiers carried out a series of attacks on sections of the Ottoman front line in the Judean Hills during the summer months, as part of their training. These attacks including the Battle of Tell 'Asur and Action of Berukin in March and April, were aimed at pushing the front line to more advantageous positions in preparation for a major attack, and to acclimatise the newly arrived infantry. This fighting continued during the summer months. By the middle of September the consolidated EEF was once again ready for large-scale offensive operations.

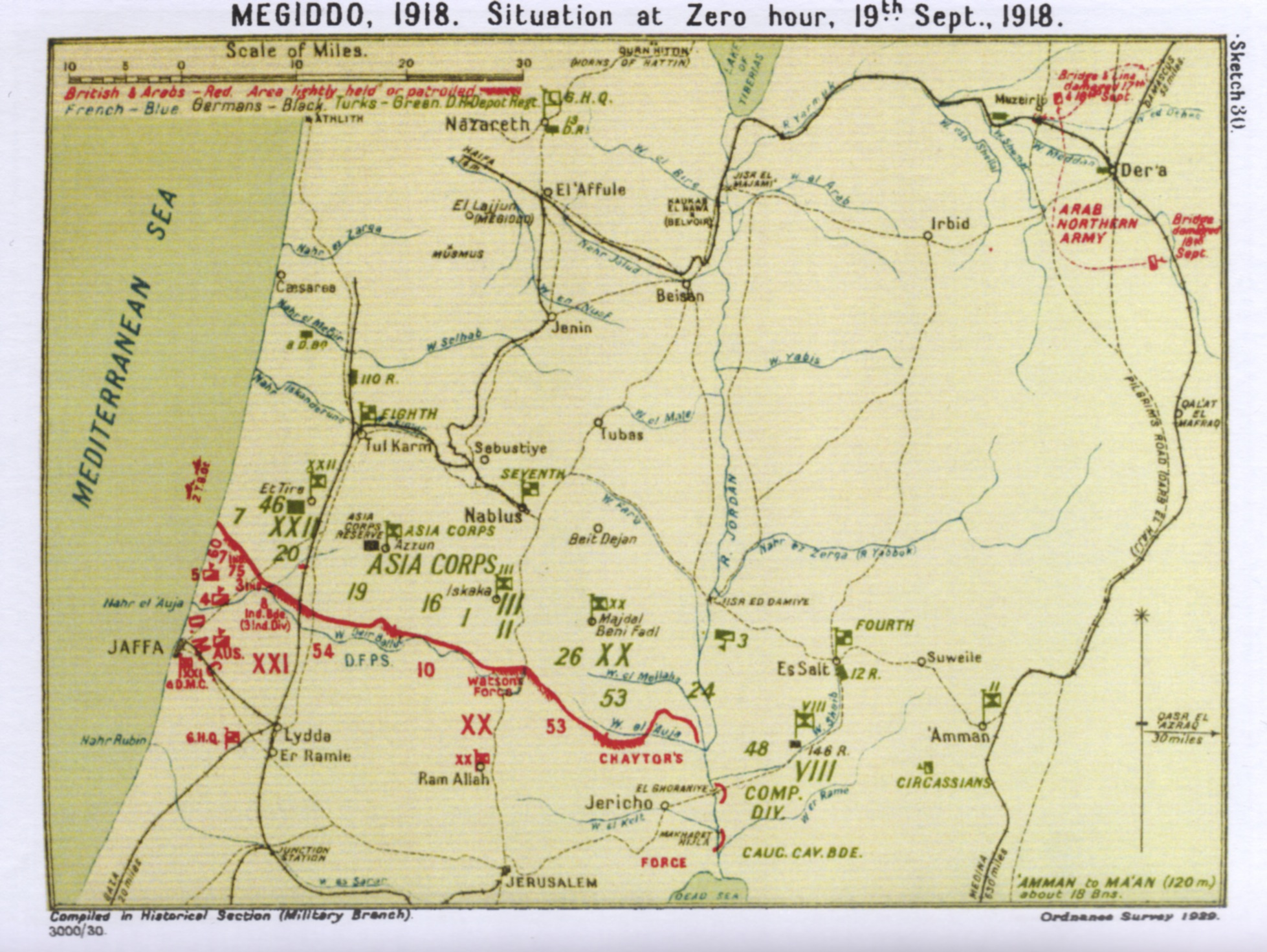
Situation at Zero hour 19 September

On 19 September, the Battle of Megiddo commenced with the XXI Corps (commanded by Lieutenant General Edward Bulfin), under cover of a creeping barrage, broke through the Ottoman front line to begin the Battle of Sharon. In the afternoon the XX Corps commanded by Lieutenant General Philip Chetwode began the Battle of Nablus, also supported by an artillery barrage. This offensive by the XX and XXI Corps, continued until midday on 21 September, when a successful flanking attack by the XXI Corps, combined with the XX Corps assault, forced the Seventh and the Eighth Armies, to disengage. The Seventh Army retreated from the Nablus area towards the Jordan River, crossing at the Jisr ed Damieh bridge before a rearguard at Nablus was captured. While the EEF infantry were fighting the Seventh and Eighth Armies in the Judean Hills, the Desert Mounted Corps commanded by the Australian Lieutenant General Harry Chauvel advanced through the gap created by the XXI Corps infantry on the morning of 19 September, to ride northwards and virtually encircle the Ottoman forces before they disengaged. The cavalry divisions captured Nazareth, Haifa, Afulah, Beisan, and Jenin before and Samakh and the Capture of Tiberias ended the Battle of Megiddo. During this time, Chaytor's Force (temporarily detached from Desert Mounted Corps) commanded by Major General Edward Chaytor, captured part of the retreating Ottoman and German column at the Capture of Jisr ed Damieh bridge over the Jordan River to cut off this line of retreat, during the Third Transjordan attack. To the east of the river, as the Ottoman Fourth Army began its retreat, Chaytor's Force advanced to capture Es Salt on 23 September and Amman on 25 September. Units of Chaytor's Force captured Amman after defeating a strong Fourth Army rearguard during the Second Battle of Amman.

== Prelude ==
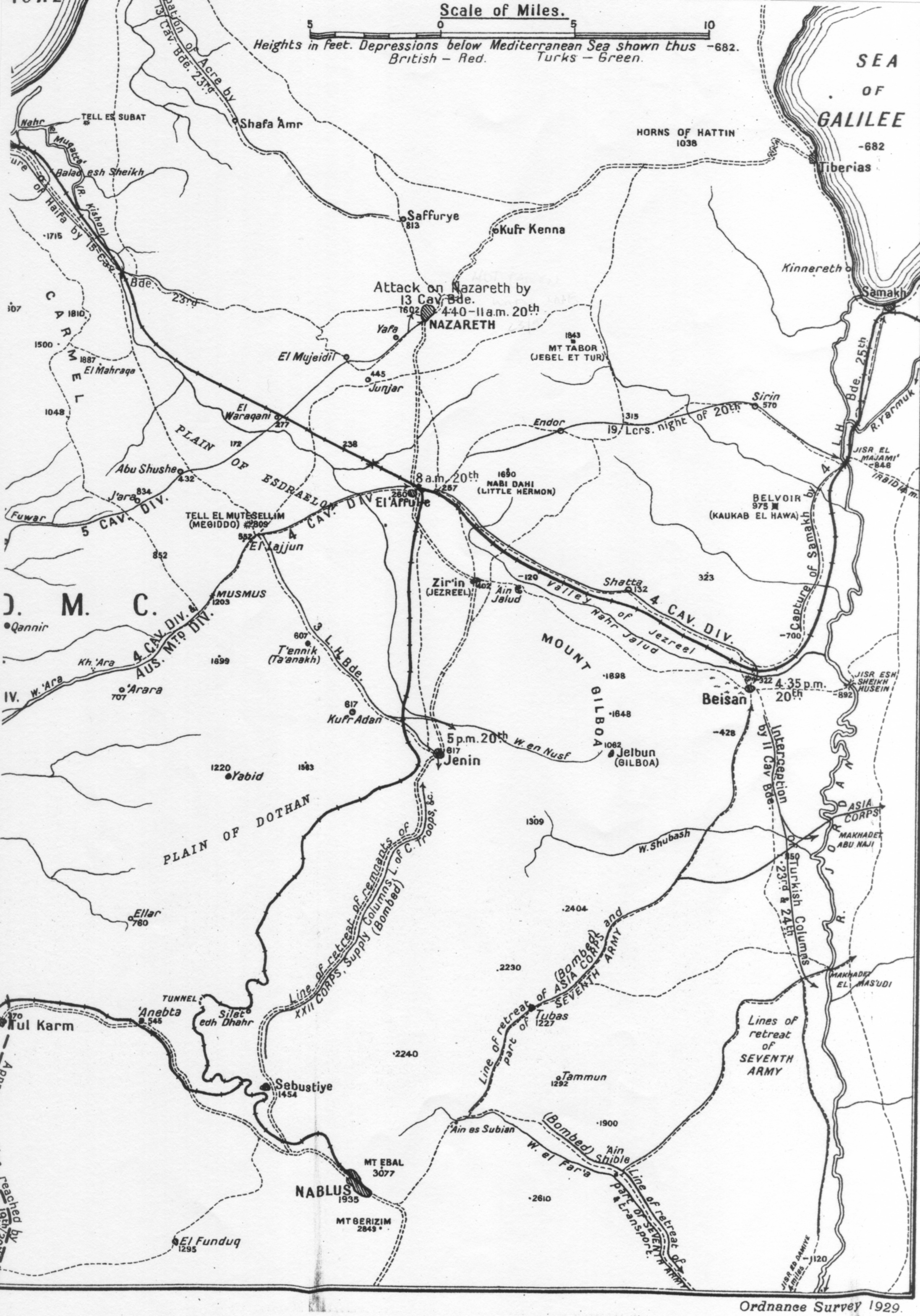
Map showing EEF cavalry advances between 19 and 25 September 1918 to Nazareth, Afulah and Beisan, to Lajjun, Jenin, Jisr el Majami, and Samakh. Also shown are the three main lines of retreat, bombed by EEF aircraft, of the Seventh and Eighth Ottoman Armies and the retreat of the Asia Corps across the Jordan River

In preparation for the Battle of Megiddo, the Desert Mounted Corps, consisting of the 4th and 5th Cavalry Divisions, the Australian Mounted Division's 3rd and 4th Light Horse Brigades, concentrated near Ramleh, Ludd (Lydda), and Jaffa. Here dumps were formed of all surplus equipment, before the brigades and divisions moved up close behind the XXI Corps infantry divisions, near the Mediterranean coast.

Each mounted division of about 3,500 troopers, consisted of three brigades, each brigade being made up of three regiments. Five of the six brigades of the 4th and 5th Cavalry Divisions, most of which had recently arrived from France, consisted of one British yeomanry regiment and two British Indian Army cavalry regiments, one of which was usually lancers, including the Indian Princely States' 15th Imperial Service Cavalry Brigade of three lancer regiments. Some of the cavalry regiments were armed in addition to their Lee–Enfield rifles, bayonets and swords, with lances. The Australian Mounted Division consisting of three light horse brigades, each with three regiments, containing a headquarters and three squadrons. With 522 men and horses in each regiment, they were armed in addition to their rifles and bayonets with swords. The mounted divisions were supported by machine gun squadrons, three artillery batteries from the Royal Horse Artillery or the Honourable Artillery Company, and light armoured car units—two Light Armoured Motor Batteries, and two Light Car Patrols.

By 17 September the 5th Cavalry Division, which would lead the advance, was deployed north-west of Sarona, eight miles (13 km) from the front line, with the 4th Cavalry Division in orange groves to the east, ten miles (16 km) from the front, and the Australian Mounted Division in reserve near Ramleh and Ludd, 17 miles (27 km) from the front line. All movement, restricted to the night hours, culminated in a general move forward on the eve of battle during the night of 18/19 September, when the Australian Mounted Division moved up to Sarona. The supplies for the three divisions concentrated in the rear in divisional trains, in massed horse-drawn transport and on endless strings of camels, clogging every road in the area. One iron ration and two days' special emergency ration for each man, and 21 pounds (9.5 kg) of grain for each horse, was carried on the trooper's horse, with an additional day's grain for each horse, carried on the first-line transport limbered wagons.

=== Advance to Lejjun ===
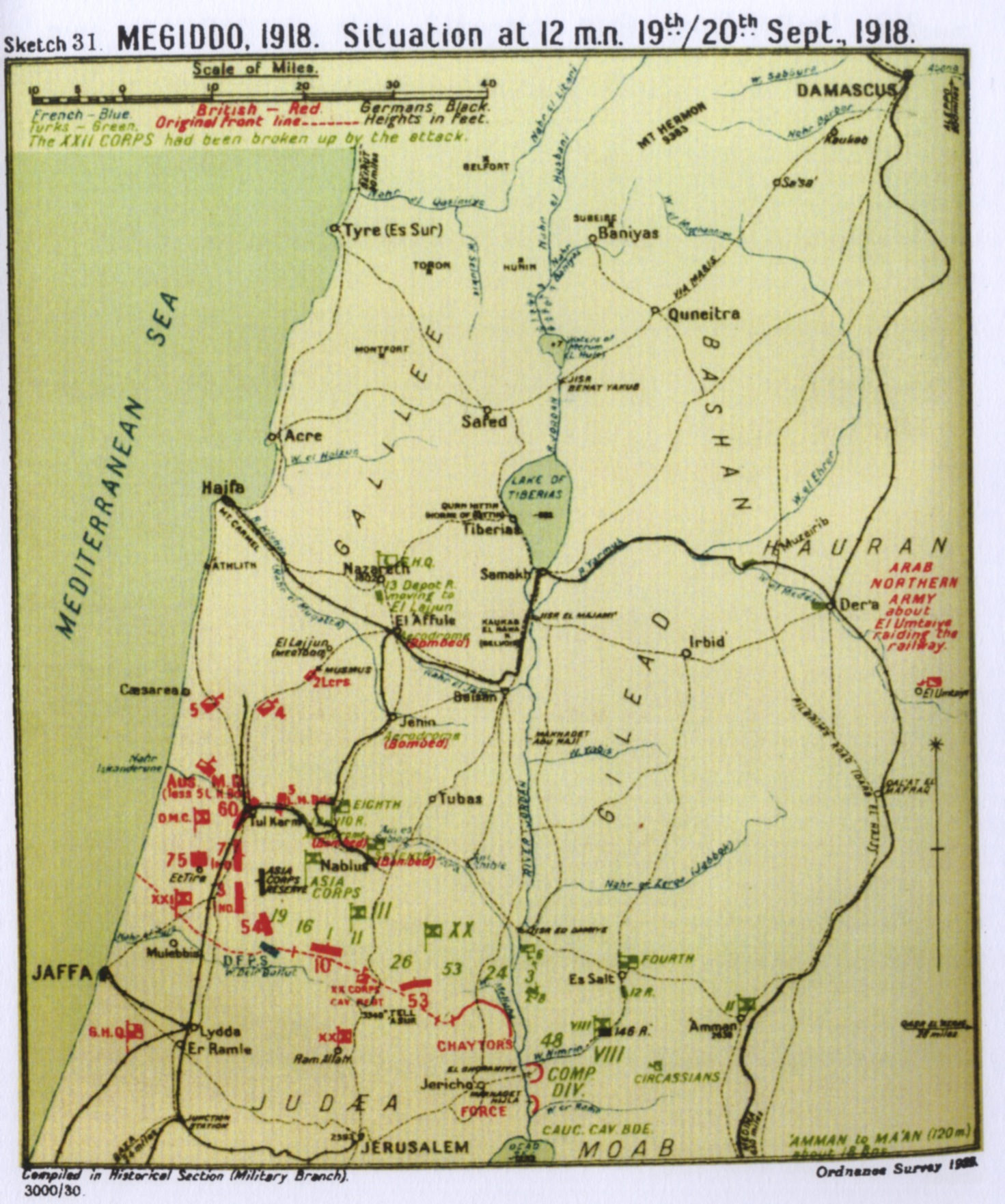
Situation at 24:00 19/20 September 1918

During the initial cavalry advance up the coastal Plain of Sharon to Litera on the Nahr el Mefjir, the Desert Mounted Corps was to advance, "strictly disregarding any enemy forces" which were not on the path of their advance. The mounted units were to cross the Mount Carmel Range from the coast to the Esdraelon Plain, through two passes. The 5th Cavalry Division took a northern and more difficult track from Sindiane to Abu Shusheh, 18 miles (29 km) south-east of Haifa, heading towards Nazareth, while the 4th Cavalry Division followed by the Australian Mounted Division in reserve crossed the mountain range by the historic southern Musmus Pass, (used by armies of the Egyptian Pharaoh Thothmes III in the 15th century BC, and the Roman Emperor Vespasian in the 1st century AD) to Lejjun before advancing to Afulah in the centre of the Esdrealon Plain. This southern pass was about 14 miles (23 km) long and about 300 yards (270 m) wide, as it followed the Wadi Ara up the side of the Samarian Hills to 1,200 feet (370 m) above sea level, before falling to the plain. During their advance, the Australian Mounted Division halted for ten minutes every hour, when saddle girths may have been loosened and a few minutes sleep snatched, with the reins looped around an arm jammed deeply into a pocket.

The Esdrealon Plain, also known as the Jezreel Valley, and the Plain of Armageddon, stretches to the white houses of Nazareth in the foothills of the Galilean Hills on its northern edge 10 miles (16 km) away, to Jenin on its southern edge at the foot of the Judean Hills, through Afulah to Beisan on its eastern edge, close to the Jordan River. On its western edge near Lejjun, at the mouth of the Musmus Pass, the ancient fortress of Megiddo on Tell al Mutesellim, dominates the Esdrealon Plain, across which Romans, Mongols, Arabs, Crusaders and the army of Napoleon had marched and fought. The road and railway network, on which the German and Ottoman forces in Palestine depended for supplies and communications, crossed this plain via the two important communication hubs of Afulah and Beisan. (See Falls Map 21 Cavalry advances detail) The railway passed from the plain into the Judean Hills south of Jenin, to wind through a narrow pass in the foothills before climbing to Messudieh Junction, where it again branched. One line ran westward to Tulkarm and Eighth Army headquarters, before turning south to the railhead to supply the Eight Army front line troops on the coastal plain, while the main railway line continued south-eastward to Nablus, and the Seventh Army headquarters.

No defensive works of any kind had been identified on the Esdrealon Plain, or covering the approaches to it during aerial reconnaissance flights, except German troops known to garrison the commander of the Yildirim Army Group, General Otto Liman von Sanders' headquarters in Nazareth. However, at 12:30 on 19 September, Liman von Sanders ordered the 13th Depot Regiment at Nazareth and military police, a total of six companies with 12 machine guns, to occupy Lejjun to defend the Musmus Pass against a possible attack. In reserve, the 3rd and 4th Light Horse Brigades, Australian Mounted Division rode 28 miles (45 km) from the south-east of Jaffa at 08:45 to arrive at 01:45 at the Nahr Iskanderun, still on the coast, on the Plain of Sharon. The 3rd Light Horse Brigade and divisional troops of the Australian Mounted Division resumed their advance, passing through Kerkuk at 05:00 on 20 September, to move through the Musmus Pass before rest between 07:30 and 08:30 for breakfast. They arrived on the Esdrealon Plain at Lejjun at 11:45 on 20 September. The 4th Light Horse Brigade had been detached to various escort and guard duties. The 4th Light Horse Regiment served as escort to the Desert Mounted Corps' headquarters, while the 11th Light Horse Regiment escorted divisional transport. The remainder of the brigade moved to Liktera at 03:00 on 20 September to organize and escort the transport convoy through the Musmus Pass. The transport of the Australian Mounted Division, and the Desert Mounted Corps, was consolidated by the brigade at Liktera, before moving at 14:00 to Kerkuk, where the 5th Cavalry Division's transport joined their column. At 16:30 the combined transport began moving through the Musmus Pass. 'A' echelon arrived at Lejjun at 21:00 on 20 September.

=== Desert Mounted Corps objectives ===
According to Woodward, "[c]oncentration, surprise, and speed were key elements in the blitzkrieg warfare planned by Allenby." The question of whether or not it was Allenby's plan has been raised in the literature. According to Chauvel, Allenby had already decided on his plan before the Second Transjordan attack in April/May. Victory at the Battle of Megiddo depended on the intense British Empire artillery barrage successfully covering the front line infantry attacks, and to drive a gap in the line so the cavalry could advance quickly to the Esdraelon Plain 50 miles (80 km) away during the first day of battle. Control of the skies was achieved and maintained by destroying German aircraft or forcing them to retire. Constant bombing raids by the Royal Flying Corps (RFC) and Australian Flying Corps (AFC), were carried out on Afulah, Tulkarm and Nablus, which cut communications with the Yildirim Army Group commander, Liman von Sanders at Nazareth.

After entering the Esdraelon Plain the Desert Mounted Corps was to ride as far as the Jordan River to encircle the Seventh and Eighth Ottoman Armies in the Judean Hills, where they were still busy fighting the XXI and the XX Corps. If the Esdraelon Plain could be quickly captured, the railways cut, the roads controlled, the lines of communication and retreat cut, two Ottoman armies could be captured. The main objectives for 20 September were:

- The 5th Cavalry Division's attack on Nazareth and Liman von Sanders' Yildirim Army Group's headquarters 70 miles (110 km) from Asurf, before clearing the plain to Afulah.
- The 4th Cavalry Division's capture of Afulah and Beisan and occupation of the bridges over the Jordan River—in particular, they were to hold or destroy the Jisr Majami bridge 12 miles (19 km) north of Beisan, 97 miles (156 km) from the old front line.
- The Australian Mounted Division, in reserve, was to occupy Lejjun, while the 3rd Light Horse Brigade advanced to capture Jenin, 68 miles (109 km) from their starting point, cutting the main line of retreat for the German and Ottoman soldiers. Nazareth has been mentioned as the place where the brigade was to "await the retreating Turks beginning to stream back through the Dothan pass." Without communications, no combined action could be organized by the Ottoman forces, and the continuing EEF infantry attack forced the Ottoman Seventh and Eighth Armies to withdraw northwards from the Judean Hills. They withdrew along the main roads and railways from Tulkarm and Nablus through the Dothan Pass to Jenin. After capturing Jenin, the 3rd Light Horse Brigade was to wait for them.

== Battle ==
At 15:35 on 20 September, Major General Henry Hodgson, commanding the Australian Mounted Division, ordered Brigadier General Lachlan Wilson's 3rd Light Horse Brigade to capture Jenin. The 9th and 10th Light Horse Regiments, accompanied by the Nottinghamshire Battery (RHA), and four cars of the 11th Light Armoured Motor Battery moved out, leaving the 8th Light Horse Regiment for local protection at Lejjun. (Note: DiMarco claims the 3rd Light Horse Brigade had entered Jenin the previous evening. [DiMarco 2008 pp. 330–1]) By 16:30, this force had left Lejjun to advancing at the fast rate of ten miles (16 km) per hour towards Jenin. As they were approaching Kufr Adan, three miles (4.8 km) north-west of Jenin, a detached troop "rode down an enemy outpost" of between 1,200 and 1,800 German and Ottoman soldiers in an olive grove on the right flank. They had "immediately deployed" with swords drawn before charging "right into the Turks." The whole force was captured including several wounded.

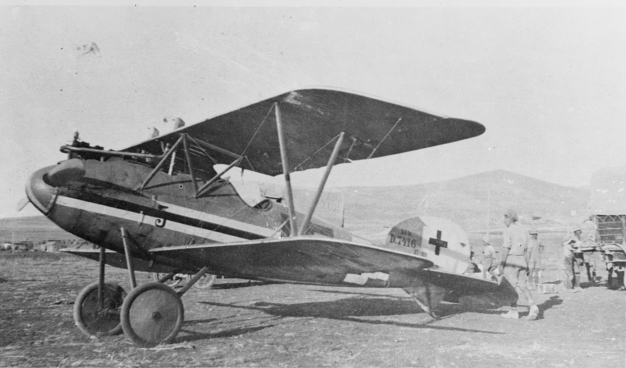
Albatros D.VA Serial 7416/17 with white/black/white stripe and intermediate type national insignia captured at Jenin

The 10th Light Horse Regiment with six machine guns of the 3rd Machine Gun Squadron formed the advanced guard. With the Afulah to Nazareth road already cut, one squadron of the advanced guard moved swiftly to control the road north from Jenin to Zir'in, on which a column of Ottoman soldiers was retiring. The remainder of the advanced guard rode directly towards Jenin, passing the railway station about 1/2 mile (0.80 km) on their right to cut the main road leading north, and the road east towards Beisan, with the 9th Light Horse Regiment following at the trot. Having cut the road and railway the 10th Light Horse Regiment turned south riding directly towards the village and railway station. They had galloped the 11 miles (18 km) from Lejjun in 70 minutes to arrive from the north-west. The Australian light horsemen charged into the town with drawn swords, to swiftly overwhelm all the German and Ottoman troops caught in the open. The 9th and the 10th Light Horse Regiments had attacked the town from two different directions, throwing the garrison into confusion. However, a "machine gun duel" between the 3rd Machine Gun Squadron and Germans, firing from windows and gardens on the light horsemen in the streets, developed. After about two hours of fighting, the Germans attempted to withdraw, when a number were killed and the remainder were captured. A total of about 4,000 prisoners were captured, along with what the General Staff Headquarters of the Australian Mounted Division's War Diary described as, an "enormous amount of booty."

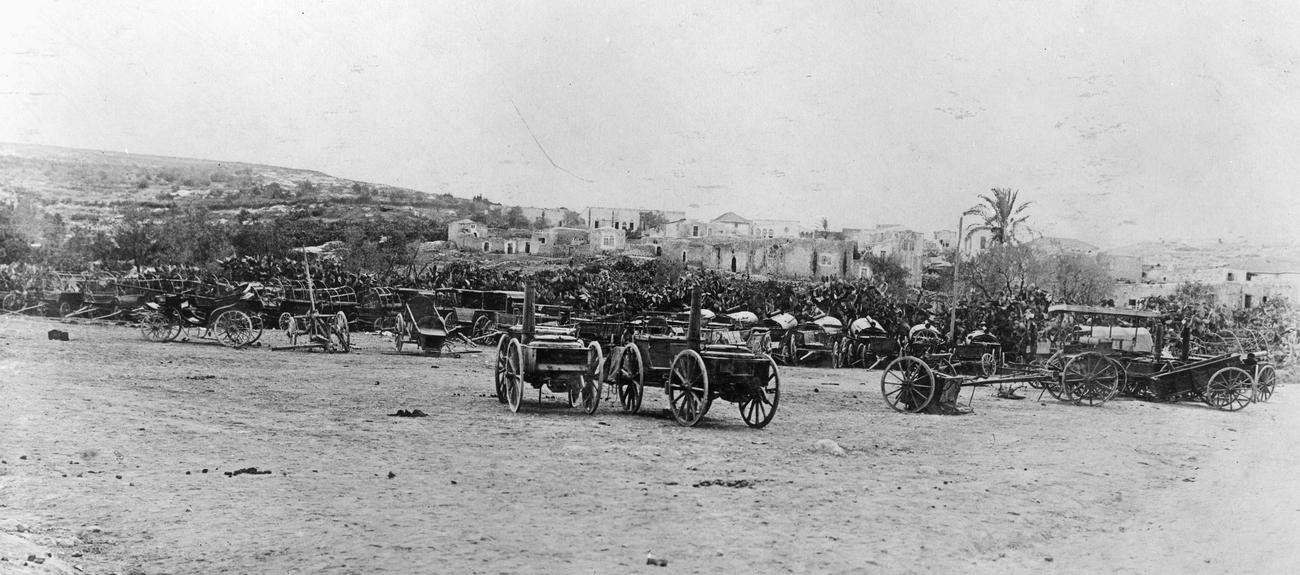
Some of the captured Ottoman transport vehicles at Jenin

Jenin had been the main supply and ordnance depot of the Ottoman Seventh and Eighth Armies, and huge quantities of war material, including guns, machine guns, and ammunition, were captured. In nearby caves, large stores of German beer, wine, and canned food were found. Jenin had also been the main German air base, and 24 burnt aircraft were found on two aerodromes. At the railway station, locomotives and rolling stock were captured, along with a number of well-equipped workshops. Three hospitals were also captured. An armed guard was placed on 120 cases of champagne (some of which was later distributed) and a "wagon load of bullion", worth nearly £20,000. Some of the gold was later used to buy food and forage for the Desert Mounted Corps, when they had outdistanced their lines of communication, and were forced to requisition supplies from the local population.

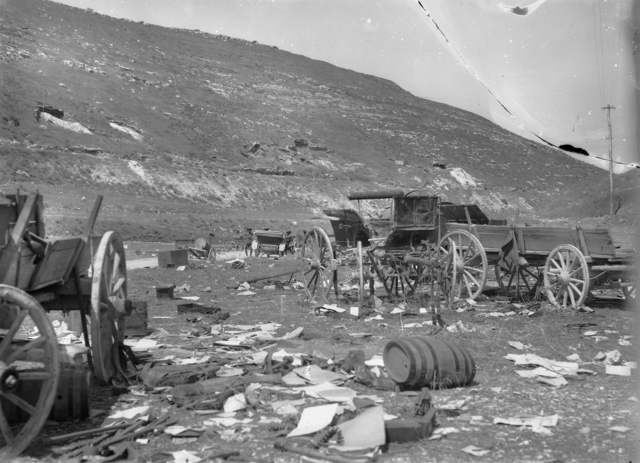
Transport destroyed by aerial bombing on the Nablus to Jenin road

After securing the town, the 9th and 10th Light Horse Regiments were deployed across the main line of retreat from the Judean Hills, at the outlet of the Dothan Pass, about one mile (1.6 km) south of Jenin, to wait for the expected retreating columns. At 21:00 on 20 September, a burst of machine gun fire stopped a long column of retreating German and Ottoman soldiers, resulting in the capture of 2,800 prisoners and four guns. During the night the light horsemen were to capture 8,000 prisoners who had retreated, in the face of EEF infantry attacks in the Judean Hills, along the good quality road from Nablus and Tulkarm, north towards Jenin and Damascus.

== Aftermath ==
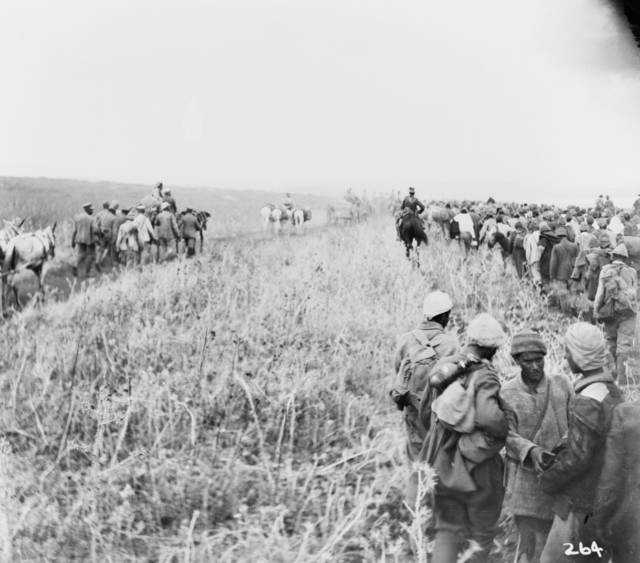
Prisoners walking from Jenin to Lejjun escorted by 8th Light Horse Regiment

Outnumbered many times over, the 3rd Light Horse Brigade force patrolled 7,075 prisoners for the remainder of the night, with drawn swords until reinforcements began to arrive. The first were the 12th Light Armoured Motor Battery, which arrived at 04:15 on 21 September. The 4th Light Horse Brigade left Lejjun at 04:30 on 21 September, to reinforce the 3rd Light Horse Brigade at Jenin. The brigade moved out less one squadron, but with the 4th and 11th Light Horse Regiments and a section of the Nottinghamshire Battery RHA, and/or the 19th Brigade RHA (less one battery and one section) to arrive at 06:00. They found virtually the whole plain covered with prisoners, motor cars, lorries, wagons, animals, and stores "in an inextricable confusion." The headquarters of the Australian Mounted Division arrived Jenin at 06:30 and, half an hour later, the 14th Cavalry Brigade (5th Cavalry Division) also arrived at Jenin to help manage the thousands of prisoners, but were able to return to their division at Afulah at 16:15 that afternoon. Meanwhile, the 8th Light Horse Regiment (3rd Light Horse Brigade) also quickly followed after being relieved at Lejjun. They arrived at Jenin at 07:00 and two hours later departed, on their way back to Lejjun, escorting a convoy of about 7,000 prisoners. It took 10 hours to escort them to the prison compound, where a total of about 14,000 prisoners would eventually be held.

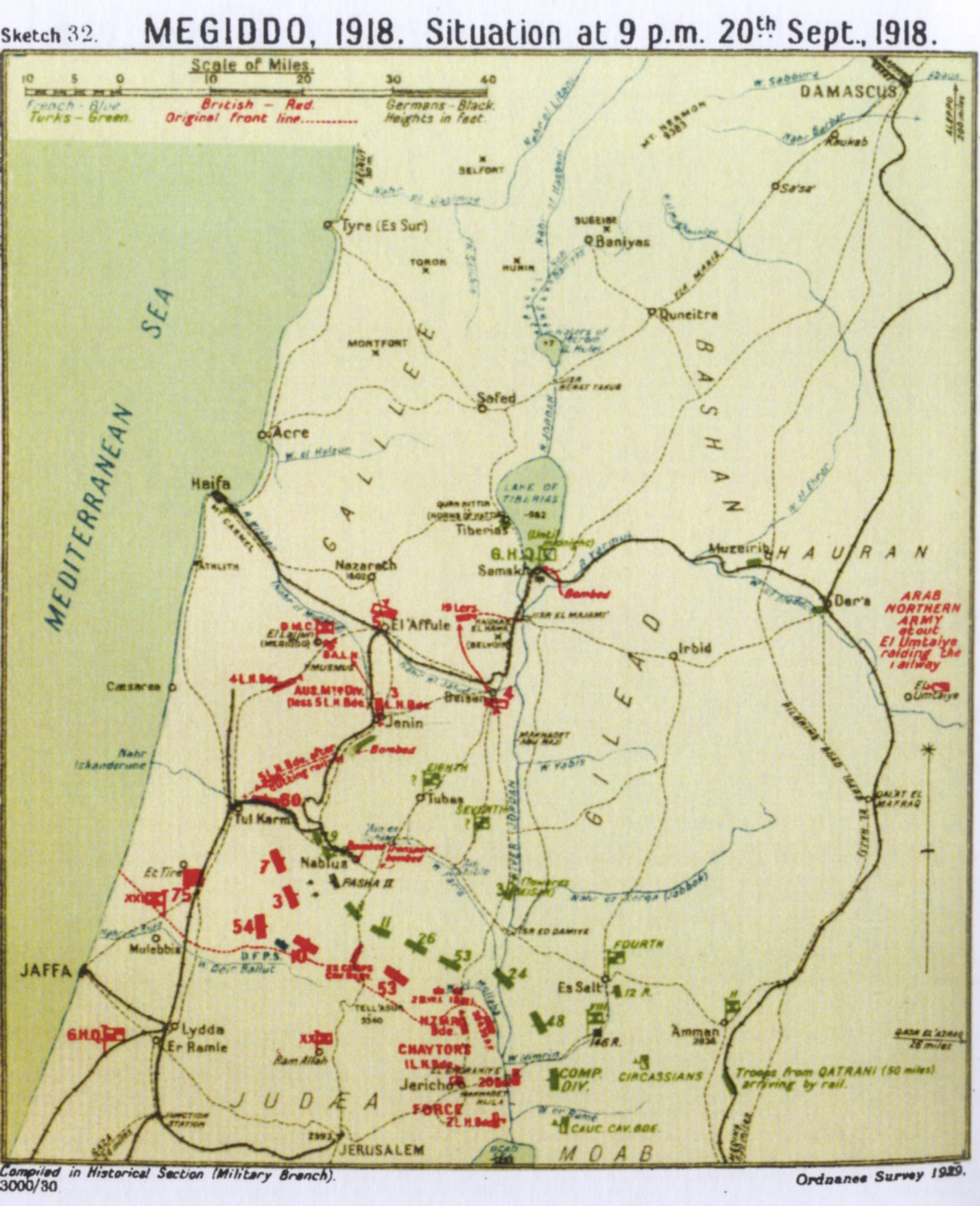
Situation at 21:00 20 September 1918

More than 40 hours after the offensive began, substantial columns of the Seventh Ottoman Army were seen withdrawing northeastwards from Nablus, in the direction of the Jordan River where many would be captured by the 11th Cavalry Brigade of the 4th Cavalry Division. Liman von Sanders, the commander of the Yildirim Army Group, had been surprised by the arrival of EEF cavalry at Nazareth in the early hours of 20 September. With no combat formations available to stop the EEF cavalry, he and his staff were forced to retire from Nazareth, driving via Tiberias, to reach Samakh in the late afternoon. Here he made arrangements to establish a strong rearguard garrison in what he planned would be the center of a rearguard line which was to stretch from Lake Hule to Irbid. Liman von Sanders drove on to Deraa on the morning of 21 September, where he received a report from the Ottoman Fourth Army, which he ordered to withdraw to the Deraa-to-Irbid line, without waiting for the southern Hejaz garrisons. He subsequently continued his journey back to Damascus.

As a result of the capture of Jenin, all the main direct northern routes across the Esdrealon Plain, which the retreating Ottoman Seventh and Eighth Armies could have used, were now held by the Desert Mounted Corps. The 4th Cavalry Division controlled the Beisan area on the eastern edge of the plain after they captured both Afulah and Beisan, while the 5th Cavalry Division garrisoned the Afulah and Nazareth areas in the center and to the north, with the Australian Mounted Division holding Jenin in the south and patrolling the surrounding area.

The 4th Cavalry Division had ridden 70 miles (110 km) (the first 20 miles (32 km) over sandy soil) and fought two actions, in 34 hours. The 13th Brigade of the 5th Cavalry Division covered 50 miles (80 km) in 22 hours. On its way to Jenin, the Australian Mounted Division rode 62 miles (100 km), with its 3rd Light Horse Brigade riding 51 miles (82 km) in less than 25 hours. These cavalry divisions had started the advance with three days rations, so they were on their last day's supplies when their brigade transport and supply companies arrived. These divisional trains had been supplied from motor lorry convoys, one of which arrived at Jenin during 21 September. The Australian Mounted Division motor ambulance transport, also rejoined their division at Jenin on 21 September, after the main road had been cleared.

The 5th Light Horse Brigade (Australian Mounted Division), which had been attached to the infantry in the Judean Hills, was ordered to rejoin their division at Jenin. The brigade doubled back to turn down the road to Jenin, arriving on dusk at 18:00 on 22 September to relieve the 3rd Light Horse Brigade, which then withdrew to Afulah. The 4th Light Horse Brigade remained at Jenin until 22 September, when it was ordered back to Afulah, where they arrived at midday on 23 September. The 5th Light Horse Brigade was still at Jenin on 25 September, the last day of the Battle of Megiddo, when it was ordered to send a regiment to reinforce the 4th Light Horse Brigade's pre-dawn attack on Samakh. They charged against a well prepared German and Ottoman rearguard during the Battle of Samakh. Later in the day, one squadron of the 8th Light Horse Regiment, 3rd Light Horse Brigade approached Tiberias along the road from Nazareth, while a squadron from the 12th Light Horse Regiment, advanced north from Samakh. Together they captured Tiberias and 56 prisoners, half of which were German. The next day Allenby held a corps commanders' conference at Jenin where he ordered the pursuit to Damascus. Infantry from the 7th Brigade of the 3rd (Lahore) Division were detached to the Desert Mounted Corps to relieve the mounted and cavalry divisions of their garrison duties. The infantry took over the captured areas, marching via Jenin, and Nazareth, to arrive at Samakh on 28 September.
