= Capture of Tiberias (1918) =

Part of the Middle Eastern theatre of World War I

Coordinates: 32°47′47″N 35°32′8″E

- Part of the Middle Eastern theatre of World War I
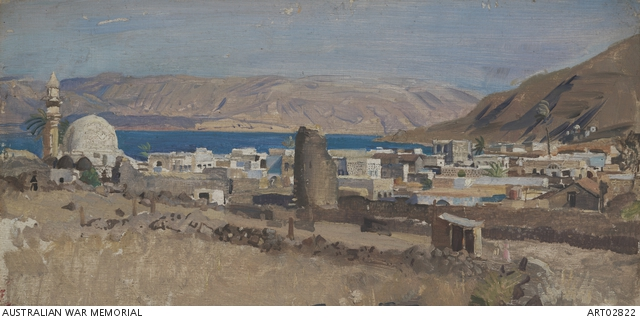
- "Tiberias" by George Lambert
Date	25 September 1918
Location	Tiberias on the western shore of the Sea of Galilee
Result	British Empire (Australian) victory

Belligerents
British Empire: Australia	Ottoman Empire; German Empire

Commanders and leaders
(British Empire) Henry Hodgson (Australia) Lachlan Wilson (Australia) William Grant	Unknown

Units involved
Australian Mounted Division; 3rd Light Horse Brigade; 4th Light Horse Brigade	Yildirim Army Group's Tiberias garrison

Casualties and losses
Unknown	100 prisoners

The Capture of Tiberias took place on 25 September 1918 during the Battle of Sharon which together with the Battle of Nablus formed the set piece Battle of Megiddo fought between 19 and 25 September in the last months of the Sinai and Palestine Campaign of the First World War. During the cavalry phase of the Battle of Sharon the Desert Mounted Corps occupied the Esdraelon Plain (also known as the Jezreel Valley and the plain of Armageddon) 40–50 miles (64–80 km) behind the front line in the Judean Hills. One squadron from each of the 3rd and 4th Light Horse Brigades Australian Mounted Division attacked and captured Tiberias (on the western shore of the Sea of Galilee also known as Lake Tiberias), along with the Yildirim Army Group's Ottoman and German garrison.

The Tiberias garrison formed part of a rearguard stretching to Samakh and on to Deraa which was intended to cover the retreat of three Ottoman armies. They were set up to delay the advance of the Desert Mounted Corps of the Egyptian Expeditionary Force (EEF) after the British Empire infantry victories at the Battle of Tulkarm, Battle of Tabsor during the Battle of Sharon. These and other battles fought during the Battle of Nablus including the Third Transjordan attack, also part of the Battle of Megiddo, forced the retreat of the Ottoman Fourth, Seventh and Eighth Armies north towards Damascus.

Tiberias was captured by two squadrons of light horse, one from the 3rd Light Horse Brigade supported by armoured cars, and one from the 4th Light Horse Brigade after fighting the Battle of Samakh. The two squadrons converged on the town from the north–west and south respectively and took 100 prisoners. The remainder of the garrison retreated northwards to form a rearguard at Lake Hule with the survivors from the Samakh garrison. The next day the Australian Mounted Division and the 5th Cavalry Division pursued the Ottoman forces towards Damascus, paralleling the pursuit on the inland route begun by the 4th Cavalry Division a day earlier.

== Background ==
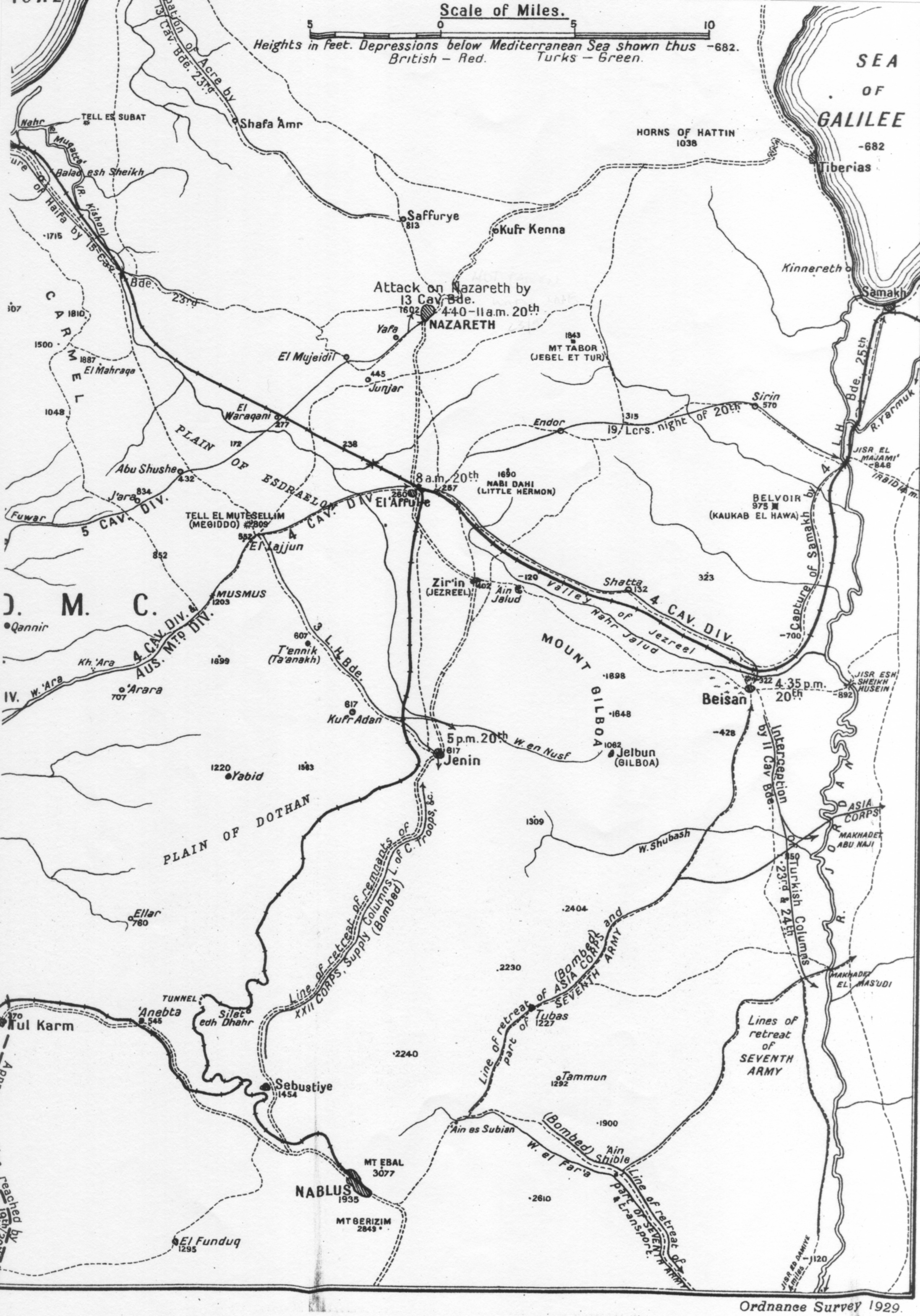
Map showing cavalry advances between 19 and 25 September 1918 to Nazareth, Afulah and Beisan, Lajjun, Jenin, Jisr el Majami and Samakh. Also shown are the three main lines of retreat bombed by aircraft and the retreat of the Seventh Ottoman Army and Asia Corps across the Jordan River.

Following the First Transjordan and the Second Transjordan attacks in March–April and April–May 1918, by the Egyptian Expeditionary Force (EEF), which had been responsible for the Sinai and Palestine Campaign since March 1916, its commander General Edmund Allenby ordered the occupation of the Jordan Valley. He also ordered the front line be extended across the Judean Hills to the Mediterranean. Most of the British infantry and Yeomanry cavalry regiments were redeployed to the Western Front to counter Ludendorff's German spring offensive and were replaced by British Indian Army infantry and cavalry. As part of re-organisation and training, these newly arrived soldiers carried out a series of attacks on sections of the Ottoman front line during the summer months. These attacks were aimed at pushing the front line to more advantageous positions in preparation for a major attack, and to acclimatise the newly arrived infantry. It was not until the middle of September that the consolidated force was ready for large-scale operations.

On 19 September, the XXI Corps commanded by Lieutenant General Edward Bulfin had, with the support of a creeping barrage, broken through the Ottoman front line to begin the Battle of Sharon. In the afternoon the XX Corps commanded by Lieutenant General Philip Chetwode was then ordered to begin the Battle of Nablus, supported by an artillery barrage. These infantry attacks by both the XX and XXI Corps, known as the Battle of Megiddo, continued until midday on 21 September, when a successful flanking attack by the XXI Corps, combined with the XX Corps assault, forced the Seventh and Eighth Armies to disengage. The Seventh Army retreated from the Nablus area towards the Jordan River, crossing at the Jisr ed Damieh bridge before the rearguard at Nablus was captured. The Desert Mounted Corps commanded by Lieutenant General Harry Chauvel advanced through the gap created by the XXI Corps infantry during the morning of 19 September to continue the Battle of Megiddo, almost encircling the Ottoman forces fighting in the Judean Hills, capturing Nazareth, Haifa, Afulah and Beisan, Jenin and Samakh before advancing to Tiberias. During this time, Chaytor's Force commanded by Major General Edward Chaytor captured part of the retreating Ottoman and German column at the capture of Jisr ed Damieh bridge to cut off this line of retreat across the Jordan River. To the east of the river, as the Fourth Army began its retreat, Chaytor's Force advanced to capture Es Salt on 23 September. Amman was captured on 25 September during the Second Battle of Amman where a strong Fourth Army rearguard was defeated on 25 September.

Tiberias is one of the Four Holy Cities of the Jews; the others being Jerusalem, Hebron and Safed. It is situated on the western shore of the Sea of Galilee, and is separated by a narrow plain from the Nazareth hills to the west. Tiberias was the seat of a Kaimmakam (district) within the Ottoman sanjak (prefecture) of Acre and had a population of about 8,600, including 7,000 Jews, many of whom were German-speaking immigrants from Poland. There were also 1,400 Muslims and 200 Christians living in the town, which was surrounded by ancient walls. At this time Tiberias was connected to southern Palestine via Nazareth by metalled roads and by an alternative route to Afulah via Beisan, which was also suitable for wheeled vehicles. The main road north from Tiberias to Damascus crossed the Jordan River at the bridge at Jisr Benat Yakub.

During the unsuccessful attack of the 5th Cavalry Division on Nazareth in the early morning of 20 September, the commander of the Yildirim Army Group commanding three Ottoman armies, Generalleutnant (comparable to a British Major General) Otto Liman von Sanders escaped to Damascus, travelling via Tiberias, Samakh and Deraa. He alerted the garrisons he passed to the advance of the EEF and ordered the establishment of a rearguard line. The line was to run from Deraa down the Yarmuk River Valley, across the Jordan River and west to Samakh, around the shore of the Sea of Galilee to Tiberias and northwards to Lake Huleh. Two main roads and the railway lines to Damascus, would be protected and time gained for the development of the defence of Damascus, if the garrisons were not defeated. Von Sanders and three senior Yildirim Army Group staff officers reached Tiberias during the afternoon of 20 September.

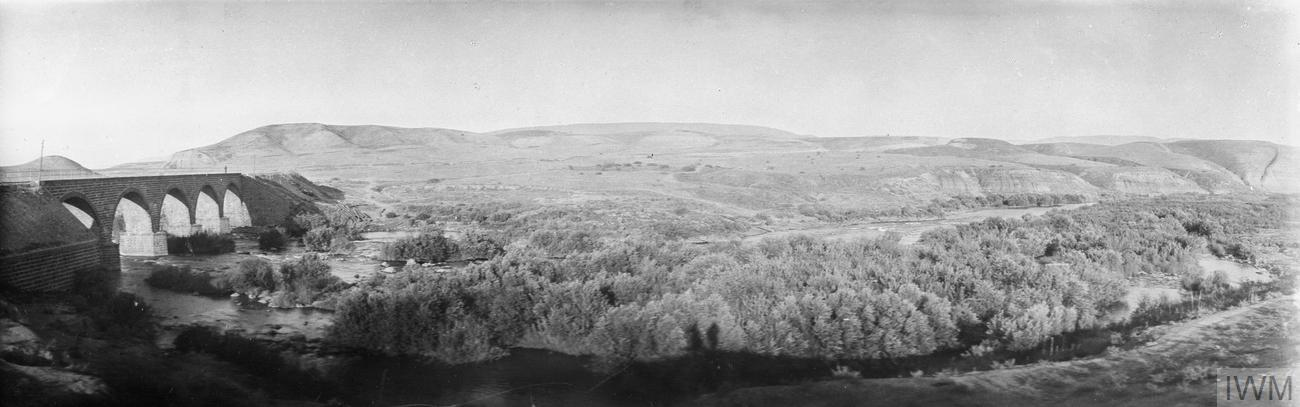
Jisr el Mejamie railway bridge over Jordan River

After the Ottoman and German garrison was captured at the Battle of Samakh in the early morning of 25 September, strong light horse patrols advanced eastwards from Samakh up the Yarmuk valley. The patrols found that every bridge over the Jordan River was in Ottoman hands and strongly guarded. One railway bridge was defended by 30 Ottoman troops with 60 German troops in a redoubt. The rugged Ain en Nimr mountain, 1,800 feet (550 m) above the Sea of Galilee and less than 2 miles (3.2 km) from its southern shore, was occupied by 500 Ottoman infantry supported by one artillery piece. Major General Henry Hodgson, commanding the Australian Mounted Division, ordered the light horse patrols back to Samakh and pushed westwards towards Tiberias.

== Prelude ==
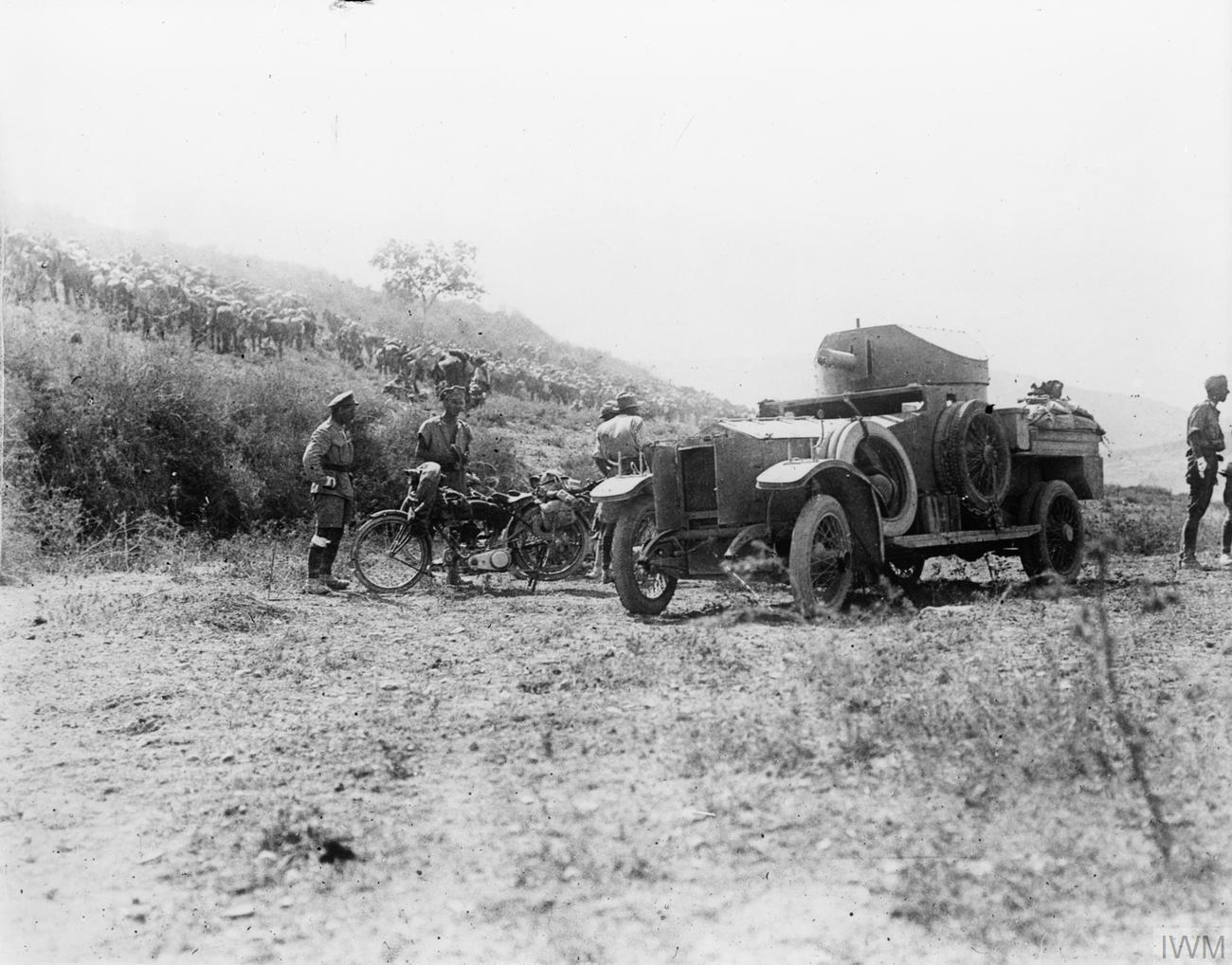
A Light Armoured Car Patrol in Samarian hills September 1918

Early in the afternoon of 25 September, the Australian Mounted Division, less the 4th Light Horse Brigade which was at Samakh, departed Afulah. A regiment of the 3rd Light Horse Brigade, supported by two armoured cars from the 12th Light Armoured Motor Battery, was ordered to reconnoitre Tiberias, ahead of the division. The division concentrated at Kafr Kanna also known as Cana, about 5 miles (8.0 km) east of Nazareth at about 22:00. (Note: The 9th Light Horse Regiment was still garrisoning Afulah and a squadron of 10th Light Horse Regiment was also away escorting prisoners to Lejjun. [3rd Light Horse Brigade War Diary Appendix 4 page 3 AWM4-10-3-44]) Meanwhile, a squadron of the 12th Light Horse Regiment of the 4th Light Horse Brigade advanced from Samakh along the shore of the Sea of Galilee towards Tiberias.

== Battle ==
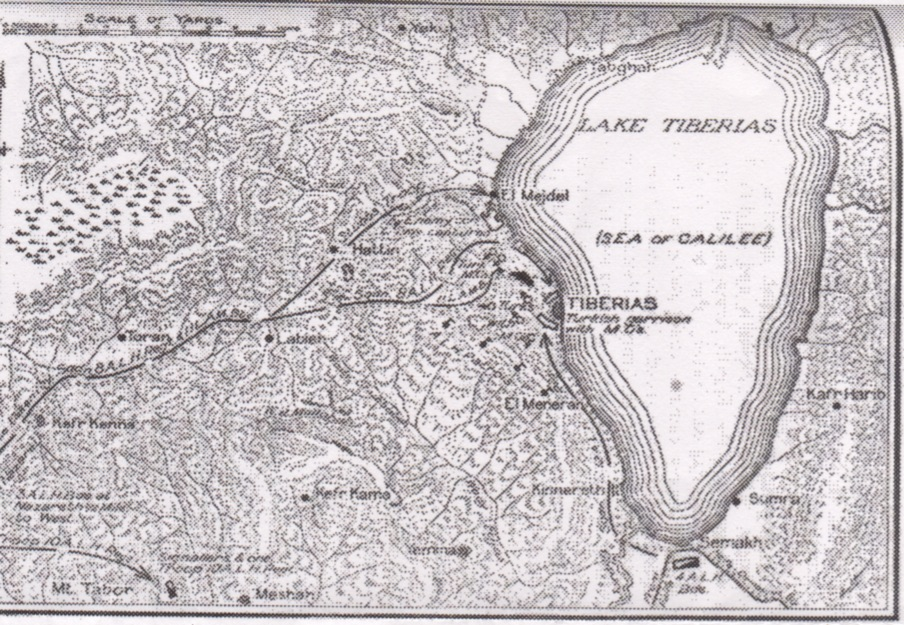
Map showing the light horse advances from Nazareth and Samakh prior to the capture of Tiberias

A squadron of the 8th Light Horse Regiment of the 3rd Light Horse Brigade, commanded by Major Lachlan Macpherson, left Nazareth at 05:00 on 25 September. They led the advance towards Tiberias along the main road, while troopers from the 10th Light Horse Regiment, also of the 3rd Light Horse Brigade, were ordered to the top of Mount Tabor. From this height, they could observe Macpherson's squadron and report on its progress to their brigade commander by heliograph.

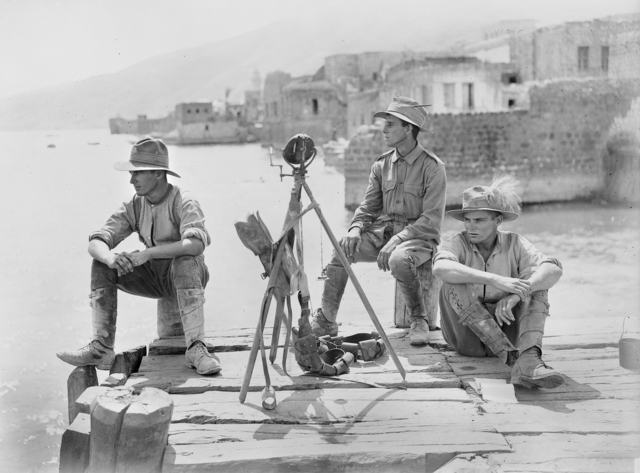
A signal post at Tiberias. Three members of the 8th Australian Light Horse Regimental Signal Station, with their heliograph on the pier on the Sea of Galilee

When Macpherson's squadron reached the high ground an Ottoman patrol saw the light horsemen, but before they could alert the Tiberias garrison, they were quickly cut off and captured. By the time a squadron of the 12th Light Horse Regiment advancing from Semakh, reached the outskirts of Tiberias at 11:30, all approaches were held by squadrons of the 3rd Light Horse Brigade.

A troop with a Hotchkiss gun was ordered to the shore of the Sea of Galilee to the north of Tiberias, where they cut the garrison's only line of retreat.

Supported by two armoured cars of the Light Armoured Motor Battery, Macpherson decided to attack Tiberias without waiting for the rest of his brigade. While one of his troops rode into the town, the armoured cars closed in from the west, the squadron from the 8th Light Horse Regiment attacked from the north–west, and the squadron from the 12th Light Horse Regiment attacked from the south–west. During this coordinated attack the 12th Light Horse Regiment troops captured a machine gun post at the gallop. The town and 100 members of the Tiberias garrison were captured by 15:00, including 20 Germans and 13 machine guns.

The rest of Brigadier General Lachlan Wilson's 3rd Light Horse Brigade and Brigadier General William Grant's 4th Light Horse Brigade, arrived to occupy Tiberias, ending Liman von Sanders' attempt to delay the pursuit by the EEF.

== Aftermath ==
As the rest of the 3rd Light Horse Brigade advanced to Tiberias, their left flank moved over the site of the 1187 AD Battle of Hattin. On 26 September, the 3rd Light Horse Brigade camped to the north of Tiberias, at Medjel on the shore of the Sea of Galilee. A squadron of the 9th Light Horse Regiment rode out at 12:30 to investigate reports of a considerable enemy force at Safed. By the time they arrived at 18:00, the force had withdrawn. Meanwhile, the 8th Light Horse Regiment restored order in the town and established guards on stores of grain while the remainder of the brigade rested after their night-time advance.

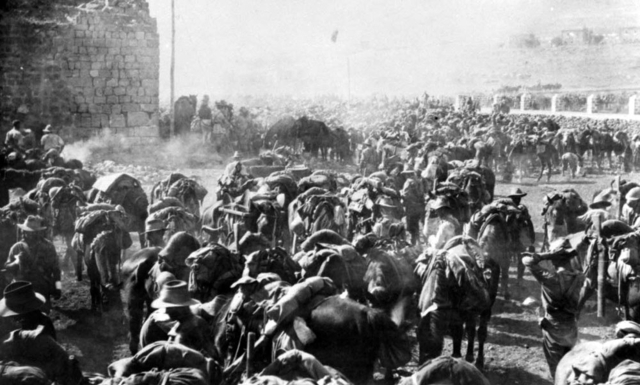
Rations being issued by the 37th Coy AASC to the 4th Light Horse Brigade at Tiberias

The loss of Tiberias ended Liman von Sanders' plans for a rearguard line extending from the Yarmuk via the Sea of Galilee and on to Lake Huleh. The remnants of the Tiberias and Samakh garrisons established a strong rearguard south of Lake Huleh, at Jisr Benat Yakub which was attacked and captured during the pursuit to Damascus.

Shortly after midnight on 26/27 September, Allenby issued orders for Chauvel's Desert Mounted Corps to continue the pursuit. The Australian Mounted Division in the Tiberias area, followed by the 5th Cavalry Division at Nazareth, were to advance along the main road to Damascus 90 miles (140 km) away, around the northern end of the Sea of Galilee via Quneitra. At 06:00 on 27 September, the 4th Light Horse Brigade left the village and arrived at Tiberias two hours later. They then received two days' supplies and one day's iron ration, which were to last until after breakfast on 29 September. At 10:00, they began the pursuit to Damascus. (Note: The 4th Light Horse Brigade moved out on 27 September less the 15th Light Horse Regiment which remained at Samakh until the 7th (Meerut) Division arrived to take over garrison duties. [4th Light Horse Brigade War Diary AWM4-10-4-21])
