= Leslie Maygar =

Recipient of the Victoria Cross

Lieutenant Colonel Leslie Cecil Maygar VC DSO VD
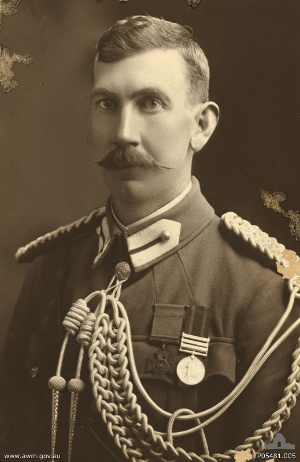
- Lieutenant Leslie Maygar c. 1903
- Born: 27 May 1868; Kilmore, Australia
- Died: 1 November 1917 (aged 49); Karm, Palestine
- Burial place: Beersheba War Cemetery
- Military career
- Allegiance: Australia
- Branch: Australian Army
- Service years: 1891–1917
- Rank: Lieutenant Colonel
- Nickname: "Elsie"
- Commands: 8th Light Horse Regiment (1915–17)
- Conflicts: Second Boer War; First World War; Gallipoli campaign; Sinai and Palestine campaign; Second Battle of Gaza; Battle of Beersheba (DOW)
- Awards: Victoria Cross; Distinguished Service Order; Mentioned in Despatches (4); Colonial Auxiliary Forces Officers' Decoration

Lieutenant Colonel Leslie Cecil Maygar, VC, DSO, VD (27 May 1868 – 1 November 1917) was an Australian recipient of the Victoria Cross, the highest award for gallantry in the face of the enemy that can be awarded to British and Commonwealth forces. He was awarded the VC for facilitating the rescue of a dismounted man while under severe rifle fire in 1902 during the Second Boer War. He later served at Gallipoli during the First World War, and died of wounds after being strafed during the Battle of Beersheba as part of the Sinai and Palestine campaign.

== Early life ==
He was born on 27 May 1868, at Dean Station, near Kilmore, Victoria. (Note: Although officially his birth date was recorded as 26 May 1872, see Wigmore 1986, p. 23) The seventh child of Edwin Willis and Helen Maygar (née Grimshaw), his full name was Edgar Leslie Cecil Willis Walker Maygar. The Victorian birth certificate is recorded as Edgar Leslie Cecil W. MAYGER, registered at Greensborough, Victoria. Both of his parents were originally from Bristol, England and the Maygar family tree has been traced to Wells, Somerset in 1640.

Educated at state schools in Kilmore and Alexandra, his family moved north to the Strathbogie Ranges region of Ruffy when he was about 20 years old, where he worked on his father's property. In March 1891 he enlisted in the Victorian Mounted Rifles.

== Military service ==
Following the outbreak of the Second Boer War, Maygar unsuccessfully attempted to volunteer for active service on several occasions with the first and second contingents of the Victorian Mounted Rifles that were departing for South Africa, but was prevented from doing so due to a decaying tooth. He was later accepted into the fifth contingent and was promoted to the rank of lieutenant. He arrived in Cape Town in March 1901. Maygar's unit was constantly in action for the next 12 months, seeing service north of Middelburg, East Transvaal, then at Rhenoster Kop, Klippan, Kornfontein and Drivelfontein, before being transferred to Natal in August.

He was 29 years old, and a lieutenant in the 5th Victorian Mounted Rifles when the following deed took place for which he was awarded the Victoria Cross:

On 23 November 1901 at Geelhoutboom, Natal, Maygar galloped out and ordered men of a detached post, which was being outflanked, to retire. The horse of one of the men was shot under him when the enemy were within 200 yards and he dismounted and lifted the man on to his own horse which bolted into boggy ground, making them both dismount. As the horse could not carry two, Maygar again put the man on its back and told him to gallop for cover at once, while he himself went on foot. All this took place under very heavy fire.

Maygar's award was presented by Lord Kitchener and he was later also mentioned in despatches. He returned to Australia in March 1902.

Maygar worked as a grazier at Ruffy near Euroa, while continuing to serve in the 8th Light Horse, Victorian Mounted Rifles, and was promoted to captain in 1905. In July 1912, he transferred to the 16th (Indi) Light Horse Regiment. Following the outbreak of the First World War he enlisted in the Australian Imperial Force, lowering his age by four years in order to do so. Appointed as a captain in the 4th Light Horse Regiment on 20 August 1914, he sailed for Egypt in October. He later fought at Gallipoli, and was promoted to major. On 17 October 1915, he was given temporary command of the 8th Light Horse Regiment, with his promotion to lieutenant colonel being confirmed in December. During the evacuation he commanded a small party of forty men, with instructions to hold the trenches at all costs until early morning, in order to allow the successful embarkation of the remainder of the force.

Following the withdrawal, Maygar commanded the 8th Light Horse Regiment during the Sinai and Palestine campaign throughout 1916 and 1917. He also temporarily commanded the 3rd Light Horse Brigade on three occasions. He was awarded the Distinguished Service Order in June 1917, and was mentioned in despatches on three occasions. He qualified for the Volunteer Officers' Decoration in July 1917. Maygar was wounded during the Battle of Beersheba by a German aircraft on 31 October 1917 and died in hospital in Karm, Palestine, on 1 November. He is buried in the Beersheba War Cemetery, now in Israel.

== Legacy ==
The Australian Army base located at Broadmeadows (a northern suburb of Melbourne, Victoria) is named Maygar Barracks in honour of Leslie Maygar; the then Captain Maygar had helped establish Broadmeadows as an Army base in 1914 to train soldiers for the First World War. There is a VC Memorial dedicated to Leslie Maygar, along with other local Victoria Cross winners in Euroa, which as of April 2012 was seeking funding to upgrade the site. A hill in the Strathbogie Ranges is named Maygars Hill in his honour, as well as a winery of the same name nearby which uses his name and image. There is also a major road called Maygar Street in north Brisbane, Queensland. His Victoria Cross is displayed at the Australian War Memorial in Canberra.

== Notes ==
Footnotes

Citations
