= 3rd Light Horse Brigade =

Formation of the Australian Army

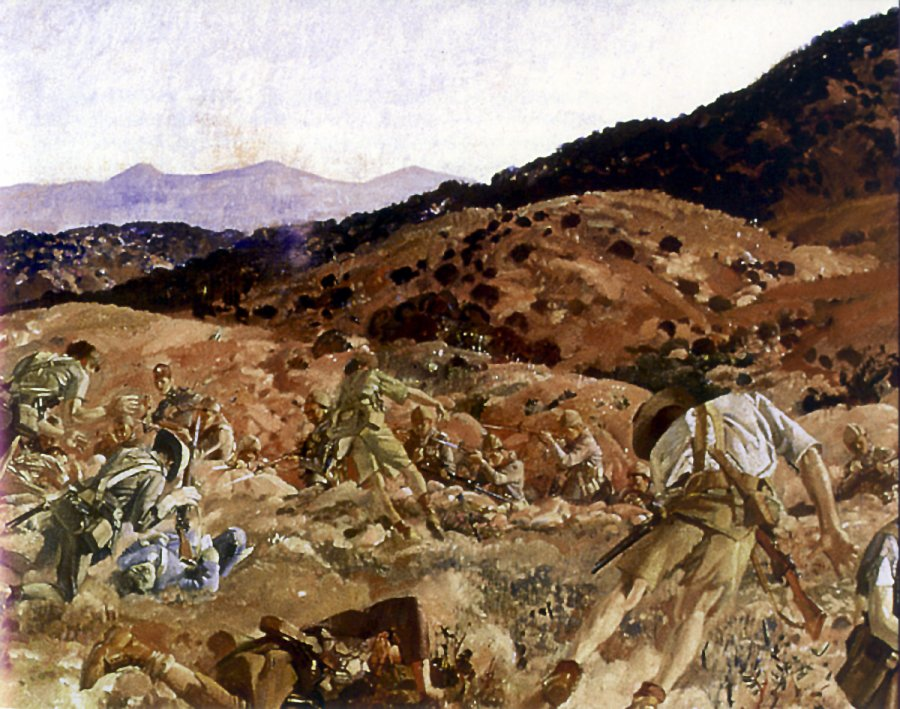
- Charge of the 3rd Light Horse Brigade at the Battle of the Nek. Painting by George Lambert, 1924
- Active: 1902–1921
- Country: Australia
- Allegiance: Australian Crown
- Branch: Australian Army
- Type: Mounted infantry
- Role: Artillery observer Cavalry tactics Charge; Desert warfare Direct fire Hand-to-hand combat Maneuver warfare Raiding; Reconnaissance; Screening; Tracking; Trench warfare
- Size: ~1,500 men
- Part of: (1) 3rd Australian Contingent, 1914–15; (2) Australian and New Zealand Army Corps, 1915–16; (3) Anzac Mounted Division, 1916–17; (4) Imperial Mounted Division, 1917; (5) Australian Mounted Division, 1917–19.
- Engagements: World War I: Gallipoli campaign; Battle of the Nek; Battle of Hill 60; Sinai and Palestine campaign; The Jifjafa Raid; Battle of Bir el Ard; Battle of Magdhaba; Battle of Rafa; First Battle of Gaza; Second Battle of Gaza; Battle of Beersheba; Battle of Mughar Ridge; Battle of Jerusalem (1917); Second Transjordan attack on Shunet Nimrin and Es Salt; Battle of Megiddo (1918); Battle of Sharon; Capture of Jenin; Capture of Damascus

Insignia
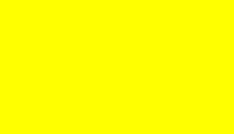
- Unit colour patch

The 3rd Light Horse Brigade was a mounted infantry brigade of the Australian Imperial Force (AIF), which served in the Middle Eastern theatre of World War I. The brigade was initially formed as a part-time militia formation in the early 1900s in Victoria. In 1914, the brigade was re-constituted as part of the AIF. The brigade first saw action while serving with the Australian and New Zealand Army Corps during the Gallipoli campaign where they were noted for their attack during the Battle of the Nek. After being withdrawn to Egypt in February 1916 they were involved in the Sinai and Palestine Campaign until the end of the war. They were attached to a number of different formations being part of the Anzac Mounted Division in March 1916 and the Australian Mounted Division in June 1917, who they remained with until the end of the war. After the war, the AIF light horse regiments were demobilised and disbanded; however, the brigade briefly existed as a part-time militia formation in New South Wales until 1921 when its regiments were reorganised into cavalry brigades.

== History ==
=== Early formation ===
The 3rd Light Horse Brigade was initially raised as part of the militia in the early 1900s, being formed sometime between 1902 and 1905. That formation was raised in Victoria, and consisted of three Australian Light Horse regiments – the 7th, 8th and 9th – all of which bore the territorial designation of the Victorian Mounted Rifles. The 7th was based in several locations including Seymour, Broadford and Mansfield; the 8th was based in Wangaratta, Rutherglen, Beechworth and other smaller centres; and the 9th was based in Echuca, Ballarat, Bendigo and several other smaller depots. In 1912, an Army-wide reorganisation resulted in some regimental designations being redistributed. At this time, the 3rd Light Horse Brigade was reconstituted in New South Wales, and consisted of the 7th (New South Wales Lancers), 9th (New South Wales Mounted Rifles) and the 11th (Australian Horse). The 7th was based around Parramatta, Sydney, Penrith and Windsor; the 9th was centred around Sydney, Camden, and Dubbo, with several other minor depots; and the 11th was based at several depots including Goulburn, Cooma, and Bega, New South Wales.

=== World War I ===
==== Formation and service at Gallipoli ====
At the outbreak of the war August 1914 the Australian Government decided to raise the all-volunteer Australian Imperial Force (AIF) consisting of 20,000 troops comprising an infantry division and a light horse brigade of three regiments to be used at the discretion of Britain. These regiments were raised from volunteers for overseas service, as the provisions of the Defence Act did not allow conscripts to be deployed overseas. Nevertheless, many of the recruits were drawn from the various militia light horse formations created as a consequence of the Kitchener Report 1910 and the introduction of Universal Training, although they were assigned to freshly raised units that were separate to the light horse regiments raised as part of the militia. Initial enlistments outstripped expectations and, as a result, a total of three light horse brigades were created in the early part of the war, each comprising three regiments, a machine gun squadron, a field ambulance, a veterinary section, supply, artillery and other supporting sections. As well, two divisional cavalry regiments were formed.

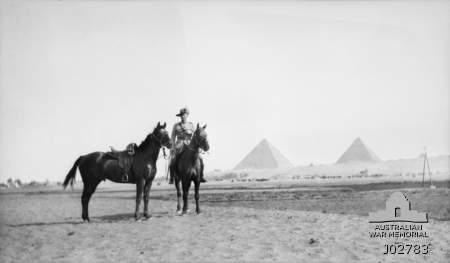
An officer from the 8th Light Horse Regiment, Egypt, 1915

The 3rd Light Horse Brigade was raised as part of the 3rd Contingent that was hastily put together at the beginning of October 1914. Brigade headquarters opened in Melbourne in early November, with equipment issuing, training and troop organisation beginning at Broadmeadows on 6 November. The brigade was organised into three regiments – the 8th, 9th and 10th – each consisting of approximately 520 fighting men organised into three squadrons. The 8th was recruited from Victoria, the 9th from Victoria and South Australia, and the 10th from Western Australia. These units were raised throughout September and October, and the brigade embarked for the Middle East in late 1914 and early 1915.

After arriving in Egypt in February – March 1915, the brigade undertook training at Mena Camp. Training focused initially on individual skills, before progressing to collective training at squadron, regimental and eventually brigade level. The brigade's first commander was Colonel (later Brigadier General) Frederic Godfrey Hughes, a pre-war officer in the part-time militia. During the early part of the war, the brigade was attached to the New Zealand and Australian Division.

In mid-May 1915, the brigade was deployed to Gallipoli as reinforcements for the infantry that had landed in April, who had become pinned around a small perimeter around a beachhead at Anzac Cove; deployed in a dismounted role, the brigade was assigned as corps troops directly under the Australian and New Zealand Army Corps. About a quarter of the strength of each light horse regiment remained in Egypt with their horses; however, additional reinforcements were provided prior to their arrival at Gallipoli, to bring them up to strength. Although there were concerns about the age of the brigade's commander, upon arrival, the brigade was assigned to hold part of the defensive perimeter that had been established around the beachhead at Anzac Cove. The regiments were pushed into the line around Walker's Ridge and Russell's Top, assuming control of positions previously held by the New Zealanders, and undertook mainly defensive roles throughout the remainder of the campaign. During this time, the light horsemen undertook patrolling operations, manned outposts, carried out sniping and worked to dig trenches and lay down wire obstacles.

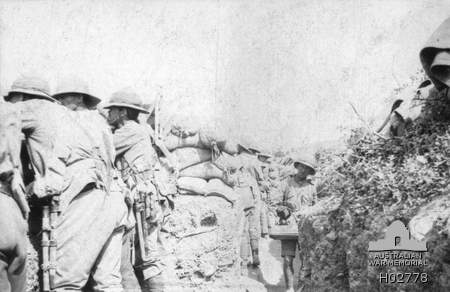
Troopers from the 9th Light Horse Regiment, Gallipoli, 1915

In August, the Allies attempted to break the deadlock on the Gallipoli peninsula, launching the August Offensive in an effort to secure the heights around Sari Bair, Chunuk Bair and Baby 700. During this effort, the 8th and 10th Light Horse Regiments took part in the attack at the Nek on 7 August, while the 9th was placed in reserve. Planned as a feint to draw attention away from efforts elsewhere, the attack proved costly for the light horsemen. Due to poor coordination, efforts to support the attack broke down, and the preparatory artillery barrage ended before the attack began, allowing the defending Ottoman troops to return to their firing positions before the first wave set out. Attacking across the narrow front, the first wave of 150 men were all killed or wounded shortly after leaving their trenches. Nevertheless, three more waves were pushed forward before the attack was halted. Total casualties in the two regiments amounted 234 killed and 138 wounded. On 27 August, the 9th and 10th Light Horse Regiments were sent as reinforcements to support the attack on Hill 60, which secured a link between Anzac Cove and Suvla. For his actions during this battle, Lieutenant Hugo Throssell later received the Victoria Cross. For the remainder of the campaign, the brigade undertook defensive duties. Hughes became ill late in the Gallipoli campaign and was evacuated. In his stead, the brigade major, John Antill, assumed command of the brigade in early October 1915.

By mid-December all three regiments were withdrawn from the peninsula, as part of the general withdrawal that followed the decision to abandon the position. The brigade was tasked with holding the line while the evacuation took place; a party of 40 men from the 8th Light Horse Regiment under Lieutenant Colonel Leslie Maygar were among the last to leave. They were subsequently returned to Egypt, sailing via Mudros.

==== Sinai and Palestine campaign ====
After the evacuation from Gallipoli, the Australian and New Zealand forces in the Middle East were reorganised. There were a large number of reinforcements that had arrived in Egypt at this time, and while the infantry was to be deployed to the Western Front, the mounted units were to remain in the Middle East. This resulted in the establishment of the Anzac Mounted Division, which consisted of the 1st, 2nd and 3rd Light Horse Brigades, and the New Zealand Mounted Rifles Brigade, under the command of Major General Harry Chauvel. At this time, the brigade was provided with a British Territorial horsed artillery battery, the 1/1st Inverness-shire Battery, which was detached from the British IV Brigade, Royal Horse Artillery (T.F.). Until July 1916, the brigade was supported by a machine gun section, but this was then expanded to a full squadron, equipped with 12 machine guns. A light horse training regiment was also established for each brigade, to provide trained reinforcements, while other supporting elements including signals, logistic, engineer, medical and veterinary support units were also assigned.

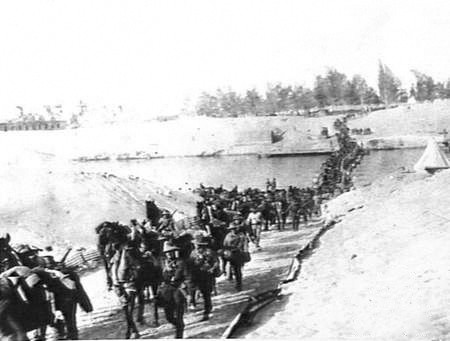
The 9th Light Horse Regiment crossing the Suez Canal, February 1916

In the early part of 1916, the brigade was employed in a defensive capacity to prevent an Ottoman attack on the Suez Canal, working to the east of the canal. In late March, the 8th Light Horse Regiment undertook a reconnaissance patrol to Muksheib to ascertain available water supplies there. While the defences were built up in the north, the light horsemen undertook a series of raids in the southern Sinai, to channel the Ottoman troops towards the main defensive positions. These raids were tasked with attacking outposts and destroying water sources. Over the period 11–14 April, a squadron from the 9th Light Horse Regiment, along with a small number of men from the 8th Light Horse Regiment, undertook a raid on Jifjafa, advancing 80 kilometres (50 mi) east of the Suez Canal to attack a bore drilling site; the raid proved successful and resulted in the destruction of the well and capture of the small Ottoman garrison force.

By late July an attack on the canal was expected, and the mounted troops were deployed to harass the advancing Ottoman forces. On the night of 3–4 August, the Battle of Romani began when an Ottoman force ran into positions occupied by the 1st Light Horse Brigade. The 3rd Light Horse Brigade was in the No. 2 Section of the canal zone during the initial fighting at Romani, but was hurriedly pushed forward to Dueidar, although this proved too slow to press the advantage. Tasked with a flanking role, the brigade was ill-prepared for this action, lacking the experience of the 1st and 2nd Light Horse Brigades, and deploying without necessary combat clothing and equipment; late in the afternoon on 5 August, the brigade attacked an Ottoman strongpoint to the south of Katia around Hamisah, capturing over 400 prisoners and a quantity of equipment, including several machine guns. After the main fighting at Romani, the brigade was involved in flanking operations around Hod el Sagi, and then later supported the New Zealand Mounted Rifles Brigade during the Battle of Bir el Abd on 9 August, tasked with advancing to Salmana on the El Arish road, in an effort to threaten the Ottoman left flank. The Ottoman defences proved too strong, though, and initial efforts by the brigade proved slow. The troopers advanced on horseback, attempting to rush the defences, but defensive fire checked their efforts and forced them to dismount. Using fire and manoeuvre techniques, a general advance began but it was carried out over too narrow a front, and after two hours was subjected to a heavy counter-attack. This triggered a withdrawal, during which a heavy artillery bombardment killed many of the 8th Light Horse Regiment's horses that were being led back by hand. In response, the 10th Light Horse Regiment was pushed forward to assist the 9th, and they succeeded in shoring up the line. The heavy resistance resulted in the Anzac Mounted Division being withdrawn to Oghratina, while the 3rd Light Horse Brigade held the left flank around Hod Abu Dhahab overnight.

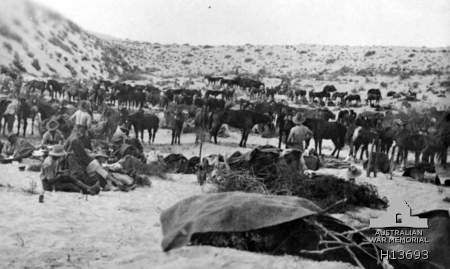
The 8th Light Horse Regiment at Romani

Command of the brigade passed to John Royston after Antill was selected to command an infantry brigade on the Western Front. Meanwhile, the brigade continued operations against the Ottoman rearguard elements, and by 12 August the oasis area had been cleared. The brigade remained in the forward areas until 21 August. A period of patrolling and small scale raids followed as the front was slowly advanced towards the frontier with Palestine. By the end of the year, the British Empire forces were in a position to undertake an advance into the eastern Sinai, following the establishment of a railway and pipeline through the northern Sinai. In late December, the brigade took part in the Battle of Maghdaba, after a 40-kilometre (25 mi) advance across the desert. On 23 December, the brigade carried out a flanking move to the north of the town, to cut off the garrison, while other elements of the Anzac Mounted Division attacked from the north-west. The attack was heavily resisted, and the Australians lack artillery support to suppress the defenders; late in the day, as water for the horses became a concern the order was given for the Australians withdraw. At the last moment, elements from the 1st Light Horse Brigade secured a redoubt to the north-west, while the 10th Light Horse Regiment moved around the eastern flank and took two positions to the south. This triggered the collapse of the Ottoman defence and allowed for a general advance. In early January 1917, another action was fought to capture Rafa. Initially, the 3rd Light Horse Brigade was held back in reserve, but as the dismounted attack stalled, they too were committed. At the point that the attack broke down, the New Zealanders captured one of the redoubts which proved to be the key to unlocking the Ottoman defence. Once the town was captured, Chauvel withdrew the bulk of his forces towards El Arish to replenish supplies and rest, and to keep them out of range of Ottoman reinforcements; meanwhile, two regiments from the 3rd Light Horse Brigade formed a rearguard to delay the Ottomans and prevent them from retaking Rafa.

In February and March 1917, the Desert Column was reorganised and expanded. The arrival of several brigades of British yeomanry troopers from Salonika resulted in the decision to raise a new division, the Imperial Mounted Division. In order to bolster these troops with an experienced element, the 3rd Light Horse Brigade was transferred from the Anzac Mounted Division to the newly formed Imperial Mounted Division. At this time, the Inverness-shire Battery remained with the Anzac Mounted Division, and the brigade subsequently received the 1/1 Nottingham Battery, which was detached from the XIX Brigade, Royal Horse Artillery (T.F.). The focus for the brigade's operations throughout 1917 was the capture of the town of Gaza. The First Battle of Gaza was fought on 26 March. During the attack, the Imperial Mounted Division was tasked with forming a screen to encircle the town and protect the infantry attack from reinforcements; however, the 3rd Light Horse Brigade was detached from the Imperial Mounted Division to reinforce the Anzac Mounted Division's attack to the north-west of the town, around El Meshaheran and El Mineh, in the early afternoon. Later, when the screen requested reinforcements after coming under attack from Ottoman reinforcements, the 8th and 9th Light Horse Regiments were sent back and secured some of the high ground to the north-west, which helped stabilise the line around Hill 405. The 10th Light Horse Regiment, forming the divisional reserve, also helped fill a gap in the line late in the day. Despite some progress in entering the town, the attempt to capture Gaza failed when the order to withdraw was given as night fell due to concerns about the arrival of Ottoman reinforcements.

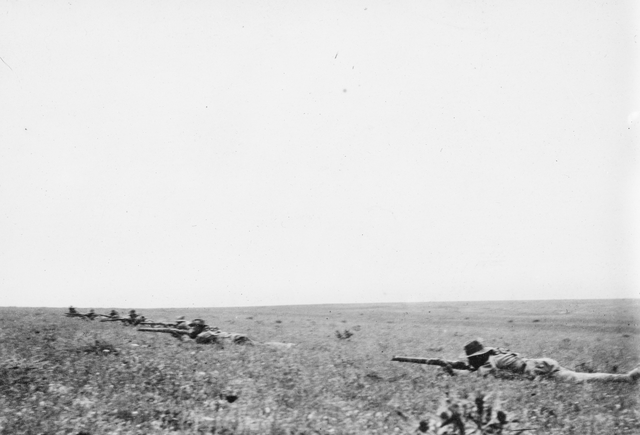
9th Light Horse Regiment troopers in a firing line during the Second Battle of Gaza

A second attempt at capturing Gaza came on 19 April. In the days before the attack, the brigade undertook reconnaissance work near Wadi el Ghuzze. The Ottoman position was located about 3 kilometres (1.9 mi) inland from the coast, around the edge of the dunes. It was strongly defended and despite efforts to reinforce the attack with tanks and gas, the direct attack proved costly and unsuccessful. The Imperial Mounted Division was heavily committed, undertaking several dismounted attacks against two south-eastern redoubts, during which the 3rd Light Horse Brigade was sent against Atawineh. Coming under heavy fire, the dismounted troopers advanced close to the redoubt and secured a number of prisoners before being halted by defensive fire and ordered to halt. Elsewhere, the infantry attack stalled, despite some gains, and eventually, with darkness falling and ammunition running low, the attack was called off.

In June, the Imperial Mounted Division was renamed the Australian Mounted Division, and a new Yeomanry Mounted Division was created as the Desert Column was expanded to a full corps, the Desert Mounted Corps. In the aftermath of the Second Battle of Gaza, British planners decided to attempt an indirect approach, focusing their efforts on Beersheba, about 50 kilometres (31 mi) from Gaza in an effort to turn the Ottoman flank. On 30 October, the Battle of Beersheba was fought. Shortly before the battle, Brigadier General Lachlan Chisholm Wilson took command of the brigade. During the fighting, the 8th Light Horse Regiment provided a screen, the rest of the 3rd Light Horse Brigade was detached from the Imperial Mounted Division to reinforce the Anzac Mounted Division attack the high ground around Tel el Saba; this took most of the day, but ultimately helped set the conditions for the 4th Light Horse Brigade's charge. Late in the afternoon, the brigade was sent to assist the attack from the east, where resistance continued until late in the day when the garrison began to flee, resulting in the capture of the town and most of its vital water wells.

The breakthrough at Beersheba paved the way for the opening of the Southern Palestine Offensive; after Gaza was captured, the brigade took part in the pursuit of the withdrawing Ottoman forces and the advance towards Jerusalem, during which they played a supporting role in actions at Haeira and Sheria and Mughar Ridge, as the Australian Mounted Division advanced towards Summil. For the capture of Jerusalem, the 10th Light Horse Regiment was detached to the British 5th Mounted Brigade to enter the city. A period of rest followed during the winter months, during which a defensive line was occupied before operations recommenced in February 1918. The British Empire troops pushed their line east towards the Jordan River to occupy the western part of the valley, and in late April and early May, the 3rd Light Horse Brigade took part in raid on Es Salt. During the action, the brigade forced a crossing around Damieh and then drove towards Es Salt, where a charge by the 8th Light Horse Regiment secured the town. The brigade held the town until 3 May when they were ordered to withdraw back to the Jordan following setbacks elsewhere. The brigade's return to the western bank was supported by aircraft from No. 3 Squadron AFC.

Summer was spent by the Jordan River amidst oppressive heat and vector borne diseases, during which there was a lull in the fighting. During this time, the troopers rotated between occupying the defensive line, resting and training; the brigade received cavalry training during this time, and was instructed in the use of swords, but the weapons were not issued at this time and the troopers used bayonets during this training. In early July, Ottoman and German forces launched an attack on the troops holding the Jordan Valley. The weight of the attack fell against other formations, but in the wake of the Battle of Abu Tellul the 3rd Light Horse Brigade relieved the 1st Light Horse Brigade in the forward areas.

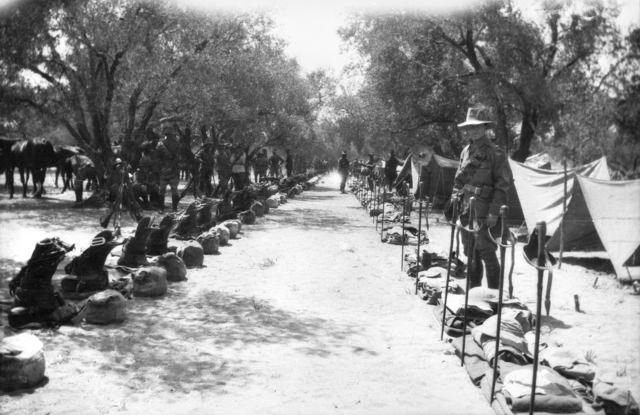
10th Light Horse Regiment lines at Ludd, September 1918

In August, further sword training took place, and the Australian Mounted Division was finally issued with swords in preparation for a renewed offensive, during which they would be employed in a more traditional cavalry role. Meanwhile, the Anzac Mounted Division remained a mounted rifle formation. In September, the British Empire forces launched their attack. The Australian Mounted Division, including the 3rd Light Horse Brigade, launched a cavalry advance along the coast driving towards Damascus, while the Anzac Mounted Division undertook a secondary effort further inland. Commencing 19 September, the brigade took part in a series of actions as part of the wider Battle of Megiddo and Battle of Sharon. On 21 September, the brigade took part in the capture of Jenin, during which they drew swords to rout a large group of Ottoman troops that had been fleeing the battle zone. The brigade then advanced from Nazareth to capture Tiberias, near the Sea of Galilee, where they fought a brief action against withdrawing rearguard forces. Two days later, the brigade attempted to cross the upper Jordan River at Jisr Benat Yakub but found the bridge there had been destroyed; after forcing an alternate crossing another skirmish was fought against rearguard forces. On 29 September, the rearguard held up the advance again around Sasa, and the 3rd Light Horse Brigade was committed to an attack in the evening, clearing the way for the 4th Light Horse Brigade to roll up part of the withdrawing force, securing a large number of prisoners. In the final advance towards Damascus, the brigade was tasked with interdicting the Damascus – Homs road, but was delayed around the Barada Gorge, before entering Damascus and moving through the town to complete their task. They were involved in several minor actions to the north while the remainder of the Australian Mounted Division remained in Damascus.

This was the brigade's last major action of the war. The brigade remained around Damascus until late in October when it began the advance towards Homs where the Australian Mounted Division was to replace the 4th Cavalry Division. On 30 October, the Ottomans surrendered, and the Armistice of Mudros came into effect, bringing an end to the fighting in the theatre.

=== Disbandment and perpetuation ===
After the conclusion of hostilities, the Australian Mounted Division undertook occupation duties in Tripoli, near the coast, until it returned to Egypt in early 1919. The brigade's individual regiments were used to quell unrest during the Egyptian revolt; commencing in March. The brigade continued patrols until late June 1919, when the troops were withdrawn from Zagazig back to Moascar for embarkation. The individual regiments embarked for Australia in early July. The horses remained behind due to cost and quarantine issues, and were either destroyed or undertook further service in Egypt or Syria.

Throughout late 1918 and early 1919, the process of demobilising the AIF continued, although this would not be complete until 1921. At this time, the militia formations that had remained in Australia for home service were reorganised to realign them with the recruitment areas that had contributed to the AIF regiments, and to replicate the AIF's organisational structure and designations. These formations had continued to exist alongside the AIF in Australia, albeit largely on paper only as they had been reduced significantly due to large-scale enlistment in the AIF, and a lack of funds and resources for training. By 1919, a 3rd Light Horse Brigade had been formed in the militia, consisting of the 6th (New South Wales Mounted Rifles), 16th (Hunter River Lancers), and 22nd Light Horse Regiments, which were based Orange, Maitland, and Bathurst, in New South Wales.

In the first couple of years after the war, plans were made to reorganise the home forces to meet the needs of peacetime while providing a strong base upon which to mobilise if necessary. By 1921, when the AIF was officially disbanded, plans were approved to raise two cavalry divisions, each of three brigades, utilising a mix of voluntary enlistment and compulsory service. At this time, the brigades were designated as cavalry brigades, rather than light horse brigades, and the 3rd Light Horse Brigade ceased to exist. Within the new structure, the 16th Light Horse Regiment became part of the 2nd Cavalry Brigade, while the 6th was assigned to the 4th Cavalry Brigade. The 22nd Light Horse was reconstituted in Tasmania as part of the 12th Mixed Brigade with its former personnel being used to raise the 1st and 21st Light Horse Regiments in its former locations.

== Composition ==
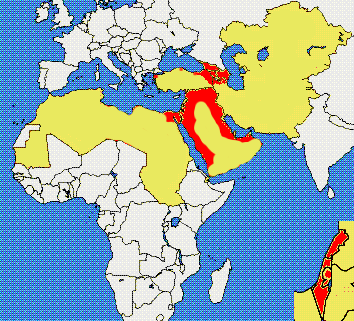
Middle Eastern Theatre during World War I

During World War I, the 3rd Light Horse Brigade consisted of the following:

- 8th Light Horse Regiment
- 9th Light Horse Regiment
- 10th Light Horse Regiment
- 3rd Light Horse Machine Gun Squadron
- 3rd Light Horse Signal Troop
- 3rd Light Horse Field Ambulance
- 3rd Light Horse Brigade Train
- 8th Mobile Veterinary Section
- 1/1st Inverness-shire Battery (from the British IV Brigade, Royal Horse Artillery (T.F.)) (1916–1917)
- 1/1 Nottingham Battery (from the XIX Brigade, Royal Horse Artillery (T.F.)) (1917–1919)
- 3rd Light Horse Training Regiment
- 3rd Light Horse Double Squadron (1916)

== Commanders ==
The following officers commanded the brigade during the war:

Brigadier General Frederic Godfrey Hughes: 17 October 1914 – 8 October 1915;
Brigadier General John MacQuarie Antill: 8 October 1915 – 8 August 1916;
Brigadier General John Robinson Royston: 8 August 1916 – 30 October 1917;
Brigadier General Lachlan Chisholm Wilson: 30 October 1917 – August 1919.

== See also ==
- 1st Light Horse Brigade
- 2nd Light Horse Brigade
- 4th Light Horse Brigade
- 5th Light Horse Brigade
