= 8th Light Horse Regiment (Australia) =

Australian Army mounted regiment

- 8th Light Horse Regiment hat badge
- Active: 1914–1919; 1921–1944
- Country: Australia
- Branch: Australian Army
- Type: Mounted infantry
- Size: Regiment
- Part of: 3rd Light Horse Brigade
- Engagements: First World War: North African Campaign; Gallipoli campaign; Sinai and Palestine Campaign

Insignia
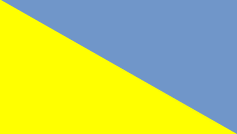
- Unit colour patch

The 8th Light Horse Regiment was a mounted rifles regiment of the Australian Army during the First World War. The regiment was raised in September 1914, and assigned to the 3rd Light Horse Brigade. The regiment fought against the forces of the Ottoman Empire, in Egypt, at Gallipoli, on the Sinai Peninsula, and in Palestine and Jordan. After the armistice the regiment eventually returned to Australia in March 1919. For its role in the war the regiment was awarded fifteen battle honours. During the inter-war years, the 8th Light Horse was re-raised as a part-time unit based in the Indi region of northern Victoria. It was later converted to a divisional cavalry regiment during the Second World War but was disbanded in 1944 without having been deployed overseas.

== Formation ==
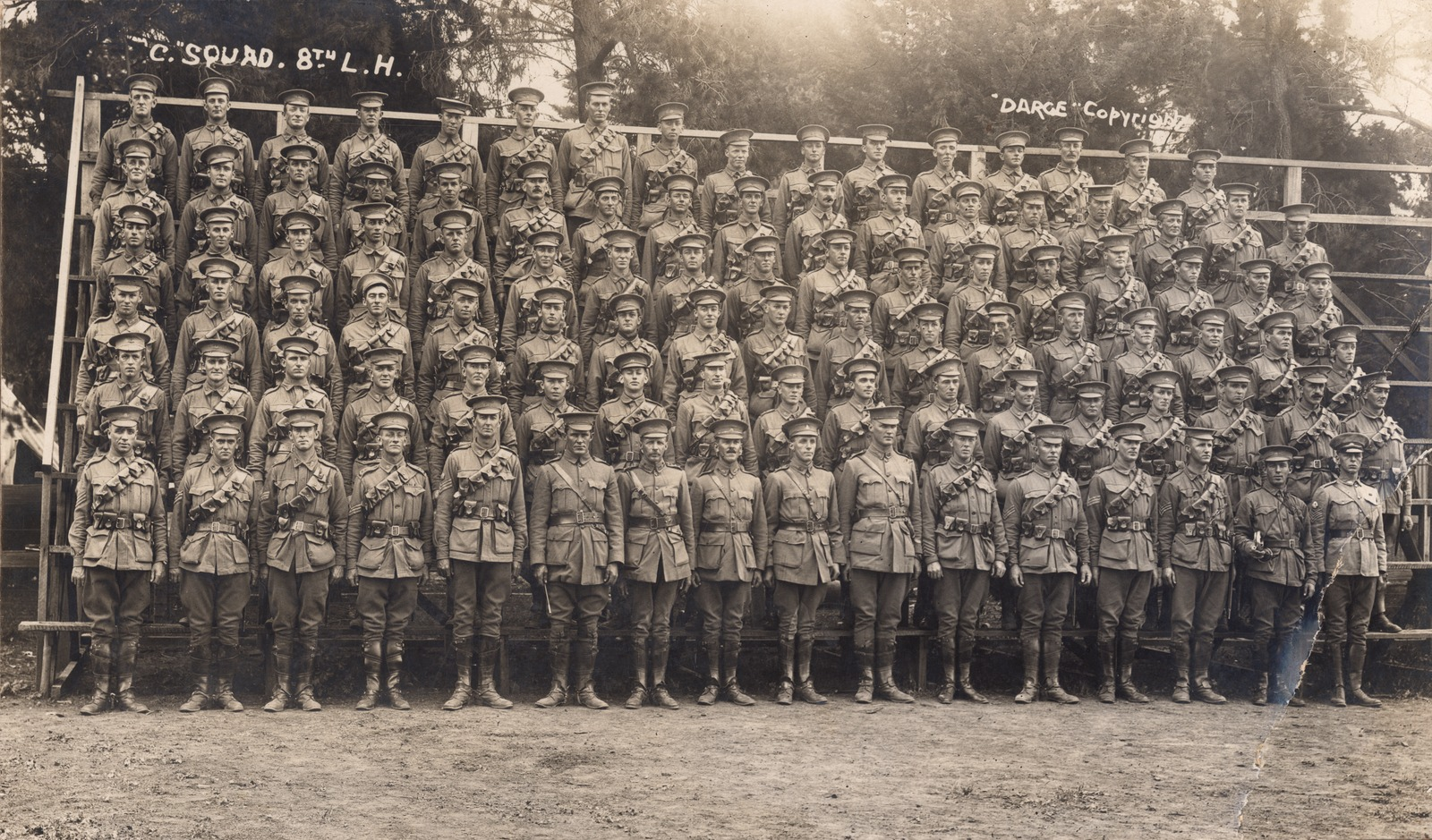
C Squadron 8th Light Horse Regiment Broadmeadows Camp 1915 State Library Victoria Accession no: H82.32

The 8th Light Horse Regiment was raised at Victoria in September 1914, originally as the 6th Light Horse Regiment, but following a reorganisation in October was renumbered the 8th Regiment, and comprised twenty-five officers and 497 other ranks serving in three squadrons, each of six troops. Each troop was divided into eight sections, of four men each. In action one man of each section, was nominated as a horse holder reducing the regiments rifle strength by a quarter. Once formed the regiment was assigned to the 3rd Light Horse Brigade, serving alongside the 9th and 10th Light Horse Regiments.

All Australian Light Horse regiments used cavalry unit designations, but were mounted rifles armed with rifles, not swords or lances, and mounted exclusively on the Australian Waler horse.

== Operational history ==
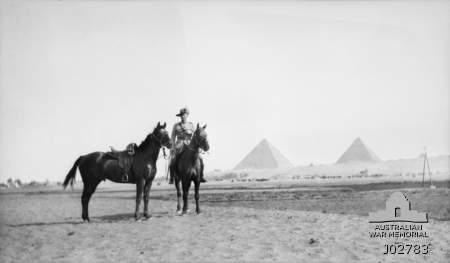
Lieutenant Carthew 8th Light Horse Regiment, Egypt

=== Gallipoli ===
In December 1914, the 8th Light Horse Regiment left Sydney for Egypt, arriving on the 1 February 1915. When the Australian infantry units were dispatched to Gallipoli, it was thought the terrain was unsuitable for mounted troops, and the light horse regiments remained in Egypt. However, heavy casualties amongst the Australian infantry battalions resulted in the deployment of the 3rd Light Horse Brigade as reinforcements in May 1915. On arrival, the regiment was attached to the New Zealand and Australian Division. The regiment was heavily involved in the Battle of the Nek, suffering severe casualties including its commanding officer, Lieutenant Colonel Alexander White, who was killed leading the first wave. The regiment were mostly used in a defensive role, until being withdrawn back to Egypt in December 1915.

=== Sinai and Palestine Campaign ===
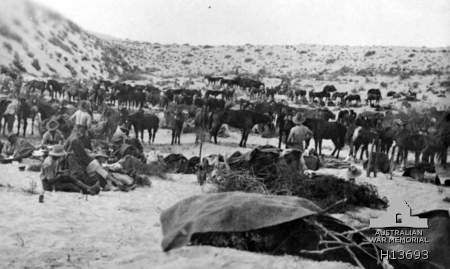
8th Light Horse at Romani

On their arrival back in Egypt, the 3rd Light Horse Brigade was assigned to the newly raised ANZAC Mounted Division, and at first given responsibility for the defence of the Suez Canal. Following their minor role in The Jifjafa Raid, the regiment did not take part in any of the early battles in the Sinai, but were instead used to patrol the large open area of the region, until the British advance into Palestine. In December 1916, they took part in the Battle of Maghdaba. The regiment and brigade were then transferred to the Imperial Mounted Division, later renamed the Australian Mounted Division. Their next battles were the unsuccessful First and Second Battles of Gaza, then the successful Battle of Beersheba in October 1917.

With the Ottoman Empire forces in retreat, the regiment was part of the pursuit into Palestine, resulting in the capture of Jerusalem in 1917, and raid across the River Jordan in 1918, at Amman and Es Salt. The regiment then took part in the capture of Tiberias and Sa'sa' in September, and entered Damascus on 1 October.

The war in the Middle East ended shortly afterwards when the armistice of Mudros was signed in October 1918. Afterwards, the regiment returned to Egypt to assist in putting down a revolt, before sailing for Australia in July 1919. The war cost the regiment almost 200 per cent casualties, 302 killed and 675 wounded.

== Perpetuation ==
In 1921, the decision was made to perpetuate the honours and traditions of the AIF by reorganising the units of the Citizens Force to replicate the numerical designations of their related AIF units. As a result, the 8th Light Horse was re-raised as a part-time unit based in the Indi region of northern Victoria within the 3rd Military District; in doing so, it assumed a complicated lineage. This included the 8th (Indi) Light Horse that had been formed in 1918 by the re-designation of the 16th (Indi) Light Horse. The 16th traced its existence back to the 8th Australian Light Horse Regiment (Victorian Mounted Rifles), which had been formed in 1903 as part of the amalgamation of Australia's colonial forces into the Australian Army after Federation.

The unit remained on the order of battle throughout the inter-war years, and upon the outbreak of the Second World War, the regiment formed part of the 3rd Cavalry Brigade, within the 2nd Cavalry Division. On 1 December 1941, the regiment was re-designated the 8th Reconnaissance Battalion (Indi Light Horse). It was again re-designated in July 1942, assuming the title of the 8th Divisional Cavalry Regiment. A unit had previously been raised with this designation when the 8th Division had been formed; however, the decision to deploy the 8th to Malaya and the islands to Australia's north in early to mid-1941 had resulted in that unit being deemed unnecessary for the 8th Division's establishment and it had subsequently been re-designated the 9th Divisional Cavalry Regiment and reassigned to the 9th Division.

The regiment was mobilised for war service and deployed to the Northern Territory to bolster the garrison there. It was eventually gazetted as an AIF unit in 1943, meaning that it could serve in an operational capacity outside of Australian territory if required, but was eventually deemed surplus to requirements as the Australian Army was partially demobilised in the later war years, and was disbanded in March 1944 at Watsonia, Victoria. In the post war period, the regiment was re-raised as an amalgamated unit, designated the 8th/13th Victorian Mounted Rifles, which remained in existence until 1991–92.

== Commanding officers ==
The following officers commanded the 8th Light Horse during the First World War:

- Lieutenant Colonel Alexander Henry White (KIA)
- Lieutenant Colonel Arthur Vivian Deeble
- Lieutenant Colonel Leslie Cecil Maygar VC, DSO, VD
- Lieutenant Colonel Archibald McGibbon McLaurin
- Lieutenant Colonel Herbert James Shannon DSO

== Battle honours ==
For its involvement in the First World War, the 8th Light Horse was awarded the following battle honours:

- Defence at ANZAC · Suvla · Sari Bair · Gallipoli 1915–1916 · Egypt 1915–1917 · Romani · Magdhaba-Rafah · Gaza-Beersheba · El Mughar · Nebi Samwill · Jerusalem · Jordan (Es Salt) · Megiddo · Sharon · Palestine 1917–1918.
