= Lachlan Chisholm Wilson =

Australian lawyer (1871–1947)

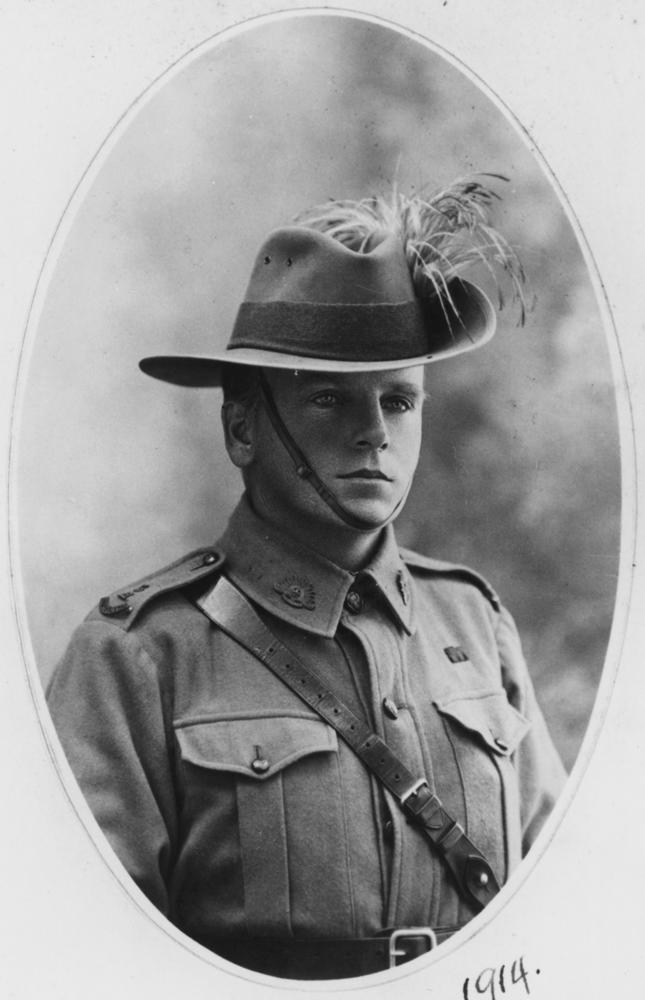
- Major Lachlan Chisholm Wilson in 1914
- Born: 11 July 1871; Logan River, Queensland
- Died: 7 April 1947 (aged 75); New Farm, Queensland
- Burial place: Toowong Cemetery
- Military career
- Allegiance: Australia
- Branch: Australian Army
- Service years: 1899–1901; 1904–1931; 1941–1942
- Rank: Brigadier General
- Commands: 1st Cavalry Brigade (1929–31); 11th Infantry Brigade (1925–29); 3rd Light Horse Brigade (1917–19); 5th Light Horse Regiment (1915–17)
- Conflicts: Second Boer War; First World War; Gallipoli campaign; Sinai and Palestine campaign; Egyptian revolution of 1919; Second World War
- Awards: Companion of the Order of the Bath; Companion of the Order of St Michael and St George; Distinguished Service Order; Colonial Auxiliary Forces Officers' Decoration; Mentioned in Despatches (5); Croix de guerre (France)
- Other work: Lawyer

Lachlan Chisholm Wilson, CB, CMG, DSO, VD (11 July 1871 – 7 April 1947) was a soldier and lawyer from Queensland, Australia. He was a brigadier general in the Australian Light Horse during the First World War.

== Early life ==
Lachlan Chisholm Wilson was born on 11 July 1871 at the Logan River, Queensland, Australia, the son of a farmer. He attended Coorparoo State School and Brisbane Grammar School. He initially worked in the Queensland Lands Department, but then chose to study law, and was admitted to the Supreme Court of Queensland in 1895, and started practice as a solicitor in Townsville.

== Military career ==
Wilson fought in the Second Boer War as a corporal in the 2nd Queensland Mounted Infantry Contingent, serving in the advance to Johannesburg and Pretoria, the Battle of Diamond Hill and other actions. Commissioned in the 15th Light Horse Regiment in 1904, he trained with other future leaders of the Light Horse under Lieutenant Colonel Harry Chauvel. Promoted major in 1911, Wilson was second-in-command of the Moreton Regiment after his return to Brisbane. There he entered into a partnership with E. K. Tully to form one of Queensland's leading law firms.

Following the outbreak of the First World War, Wilson joined the Australian Imperial Force as a major on 30 September 1914. In November he transferred from the 7th Light Horse Regiment to the 5th Light Horse Regiment, of which he became second-in-command. He landed at Gallipoli in May 1915 and took charge of the 5th on 1 August after its commanding officer, Lt. Col. Hubert Harris, was killed. A lieutenant-colonel from that date, Wilson mounted a successful raid against Bird Trenches near Gaba Tepe on 23 August; in November, after repulsing a Turkish attack, he seized positions known thereafter as Wilson's Lookout.

Following the evacuation of Allied forces to Egypt, in April 1916 he led the advance of the Anzac Mounted Division across the Suez Canal when the Turks attacked near Romani. Wilson took part in almost all the major engagements between the Battle of Romani (4–5 August 1916) and the Capture of Damascus (October 1918). He introduced the Queensland spear-point pump to obtain water in the desert: it was a portable device which could raise water quickly; with canvas troughs, it simplified the watering of the horses

When Brigadier General John Royston returned to South Africa on the eve of the Third Battle of Gaza (30 October 1917), Wilson was given command of the 3rd Light Horse Brigade as colonel and temporary brigadier general. Short and stocky, quiet and shy, Wilson was the antithesis of his predecessor. In the Second Battle of the Jordan (30 April – 4 May 1918) he seized Es Salt with astonishing speed and, when the Turks counter-attacked, succeeded in withdrawing his brigade from a perilous situation. Forty miles (64 km) behind the Turkish lines after the breakthrough at Megiddo (20 September), Wilson's brigade advanced southwards on Jenin, capturing three or four times their own number.

On 1 October Wilson changed the course of the battle for Damascus by boldly directing his brigade through the city at dawn, leaving thousands of Turks cut off while his regiments pressed up the road to Homs. He called off the pursuit on 2 October after taking another 2,000 Turks; in a fortnight the 3rd Brigade had captured over 11,000 prisoners. His brigade was the first to capture Damascus arriving some hours before Lawrence of Arabia.

While Wilson was at Moascar early in 1919 waiting to embark for Australia, a rebellion broke out against British rule in Egypt. He was ordered to Zagazig where he soon had seven regiments under his command. Clashes with rioters cost his troops about twenty casualties, but by April the violence had subsided and repatriation was resumed. Wilson was appointed Companion of the Order of the Bath (1919) and Companion of the Order of St Michael and St George (1916), awarded the Distinguished Service Order (1919) and the French Croix de guerre (1917), and mentioned in despatches five times.

Of Wilson, the Australian Official Historian of the desert campaigns, Henry Gullett wrote: "Wilson's appearance and bearing were always in contrast to the confident, dashing, picturesque men that he led. He was shy in manner and very sparing of speech, but his quiet figure concealed the spirit of a great master of horse, and between the time of his promotion to brigadier and his dramatic, unpremeditated dash through Damascus as the vanguard of the British and Arab Armies a year later, he became marked as a leader capable of handling a command far more important than a brigade."

During the Second World War he was a member of the Volunteer Defence Corps, and was at one time commander of the corps in Queensland.

== Later life ==
Wilson died at his home in Bowen Terrace, New Farm, Brisbane on 7 April 1947 following an 18-month illness. He was buried in Toowong Cemetery on 9 April 1947. His funeral was attended by senior military personnel including Sir Donald Cameron, Sir William Glasgow and Major General Robert Nimmo.
