= Kawkab, Rif Dimashq =

Kawkab كوكب
- Village
- Location in Syria
- Coordinates: 33°22′51″N 36°10′55″E
- Country: Syria
- Governorate: Rif Dimashq Governorate
- District: Qatana District
- Nahiyah: Qatana

Population (2004 census)
  - Total: 1,188
- Time zone: UTC+2 (EET)
  - Summer (DST): UTC+3 (EEST)

Kawkab (Arabic: كوكب) is a Syrian village in the Qatana District of the Rif Dimashq Governorate. Kawkab is Arabic for "star". According to the Syria Central Bureau of Statistics (CBS), Kawkab had a population of 1,188 in the 2004 census. Its inhabitants are predominantly Sunni Muslims.

== History ==
In 1838, Eli Smith noted it as a village, located in Wady 'el-Ajam, between Damascus and the Hauran.

On 30 September, 1918 Kawkab was the site of the World War I successful "Charge at Kaukab" of the Australian 4th and 12th Light Horse Regiments directed against dug-in German and Ottoman remnants of the Seventh and Eighth Armies, joined by units from Damascus.

== Bibliography ==
- Robinson, E.; Smith, E. (1841). Biblical Researches in Palestine, Mount Sinai and Arabia Petraea: A Journal of Travels in the year 1838. Vol. 3. Boston: Crocker & Brewster.
