= 12th Light Horse Regiment (Australia) =

Mounted regiment of the Australian Army

- 12th Australian Light Horse Regiment hat badge
- Active: 1915–1919; 1921–1936; 1938–1943
- Country: Australia
- Branch: Australian Army
- Type: Light horse
- Role: Mounted infantry
- Size: ~ 500 men
- Part of: 4th Light Horse Brigade
- Mottos: Latin: Virtutis Fortuna Comes ("Fortune is the Companion of Valour")
- Engagements: First World War: Gallipoli campaign; Suvla; Sari Bair; Sinai and Palestine campaign; Beersheba; El Mughar; Nebi Samwill; Jerusalem; Jordan (Es Salt); Megiddo; Sharon; Samakh; Damascus

Insignia
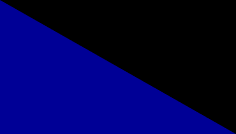
- Unit colour patch

The 12th Light Horse Regiment was a mounted unit of the Australian Army. It was raised in New South Wales in 1915 as part of the Australian Imperial Force (AIF) for service during the First World War. After fighting at Gallipoli as reinforcements, the regiment served in the Sinai and Palestine campaign against the Ottoman Empire, seeing action in several notable battles including Beersheba, the capture of Jerusalem, Megiddo and the capture of Damascus. In the aftermath of the war, the regiment was used to suppress the 1919 Egyptian Uprising, before being disbanded in late 1919.

In 1921, as part of a re-organisation of Australia's military following the disbandment of the AIF, the regiment was re-raised as a part-time unit of the Citizens Force based in New South Wales. It remained in existence throughout the inter-war years until it was amalgamated with the 24th Light Horse Regiment in 1936 as a result of manpower shortages. The 12th Light Horse Regiment was re-formed in 1938 and undertook garrison duties in Australia during the Second World War, having been converted first to the 12th Motor Regiment and then to an armoured car regiment, the 12th Armoured Car Regiment. It was disbanded in 1943 without having seen action and was never re-raised. Its honours and traditions are perpetuated in the 12th/16th Hunter River Lancers.

== History ==
=== Formation and training ===
The 12th Light Horse Regiment was established on 1 March 1915 (Note: A previous 12th Light Horse Regiment had been formed in Tasmania in 1903, although that unit is not a predecessor of the 12th Light Horse Regiment that was raised during the First World War. The Tasmanian unit re-designated as the 26th Light Horse in 1912, and subsequently contributed a squadron to the 3rd Light Horse Regiment during the war and was later re-raised as the 22nd Light Horse Regiment.) at Liverpool, New South Wales, and two days later began forming at Holsworthy as part of the all-volunteer Australian Imperial Force (AIF), which was raised for service overseas during the First World War. Drawing the majority of its personnel from outback New South Wales, the regiment was assigned to the 4th Light Horse Brigade along with the 11th and 13th Light Horse Regiments and was placed under the command of Lieutenant Colonel Percy Abbott. Upon establishment, the regiment had an authorised strength of 25 officers and 497 other ranks, who were organised into a regimental headquarters and three squadrons, each of which consisted of six troops. Armed usually with standard infantry weapons instead of swords or lances, and mounted on Australian Waler horses, the Australian light horse regiments performed several roles and were similar to both cavalry and mounted infantry. They mainly fought dismounted, using their horses to obtain mobility that foot soldiers did not possess, but they could also conduct certain cavalry roles, such as scouting and screening, while mounted.

Following this, the regiment undertook basic training including weapons handling, ceremonial drill, mounted and dismounted tactics and regimental manoeuvres. In late April, they marched through the centre of Sydney as part of a farewell before deploying overseas. On 11 June, after the brigade had concentrated, the regiment embarked upon the troopship SS Suevic. After four days steaming, the ship put into Adelaide, South Australia, where the regiment disembarked their horses due to concerns about death rates among horses travelling at that time of year. The men continued on their journey three days later, undertaking rifle and signals training on deck during the day. They crossed the equator in the early afternoon on 5 July; a short time later an epidemic of measles broke out.

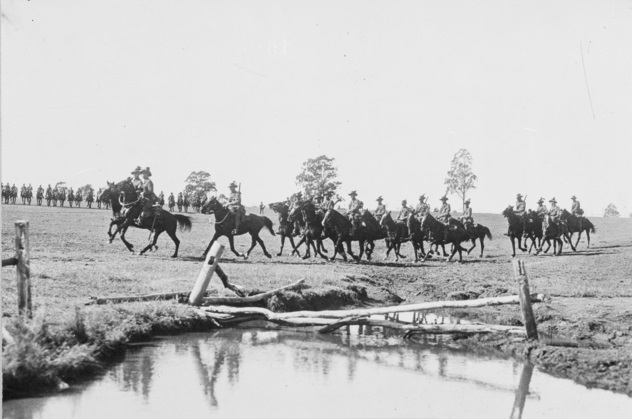
Members of the 12th Light Horse training at Holsworthy, 1915.

On 11 July, the 4th Light Horse Brigade received orders to interrupt its journey to Egypt and instead disembark at Aden, where an Ottoman attack was expected. They were briefly put ashore during this time and conducted a reconnaissance to the frontier, before undertaking a 6 mi (9.7 km) route march. The expected attack did not come and on 18 July the regiment re-embarked, arriving at Suez on 23 July. Moving into a camp at Heliopolis, near Cairo, after receiving a draft of 54 reinforcements and about 350 replacement horses, the regiment began a period of intense training and guard duties as they acclimatised to the local conditions.

=== Gallipoli ===
Elsewhere, the Gallipoli campaign had developed into a stalemate. The regiments of the 1st, 2nd and 3rd Light Horse Brigades had already been sent to the peninsula as reinforcements; however, the failed August Offensive had resulted in heavy casualties for the Australians and further reinforcements were required. As a result, the regiments of the 4th Light Horse Brigade were broken up to make up the losses in the other brigades. The troops were not initially informed of this, and following a train trip to Alexandria on 25 August they embarked upon the transport SS Marquette and sailed to Lemnos Island where they were transferred to Prince Abbas. Early on the morning of 29 August, the regiment went ashore at Anzac Cove upon lighters, and later that afternoon received the news that they were to be broken up and distributed among the other New South Wales light horse regiments that were already ashore. The Machine-Gun Section and 'A' Squadron were sent to the 1st Light Horse Regiment around "Walker's Ridge", becoming that regiment's 'B' Squadron; 'B' Squadron went to the 7th Light Horse Regiment at "Ryrie's Post", adopting the designation of 'D' Squadron; and 'C' Squadron went to the 6th Light Horse Regiment around "Holly Spur" and "Lone Pine", becoming their 'D' Squadron. The Regimental Headquarters was absorbed by the 3rd Light Horse Brigade's headquarters, while Abbott took command of the 10th Light Horse Regiment.

For the remainder of the campaign, about 600 men from the regiment – including a batch of reinforcements that arrived in early October – carried out mainly defensive duties before leaving with the last Australian troops to be evacuated from the peninsula on 20 December. They did not take part in any large-scale battles, but were involved in fighting off a number of sharp attacks. The exact number of casualties suffered is not known, but 18 men from the regiment are known to have been killed in this time.

=== Sinai ===
Following their evacuation from Gallipoli, the regiment was reconstituted on 22 February 1916 when all three squadrons assembled at Heliopolis. Under a new commanding officer, Lieutenant Colonel John Royston – a veteran of the Boer War who had replaced Abbott after the latter had been sent to England – the regiment began to re-form. At the time of re-forming, it had been intended that the 12th would be assigned to the 5th Division as its divisional light horse regiment; however, it was decided to reduce the size of divisional light horse components to a squadron, and the 12th were removed from the 5th Division's order of battle. Although other units, such as part of the 4th and all of the 13th Light Horse Regiment, were sent to Europe to fight on the Western Front, the 12th, along with the bulk of the Australian light horse units, were to remain in the Middle East, where they would take part in the Sinai and Palestine campaign. Initially, the regiment was not brigaded and served as a detached unit.

After conducting infantry training around Tel-el-Kebir in early April, the regiment crossed the Suez Canal along a new railway that was being constructed through the Sinai towards Palestine. Here it was established around Kantara and a position known as "Hill 70". The following month, Ottoman forces clashed with positions around the railhead and on 14 May, a British garrison was attacked at Dueidar, about 9 mi (15 km) away from the regiment's positions at Hill 70. Tasked with relieving the Royal Scots Fusiliers, two squadrons were dispatched. Delayed by a navigational error, and suffering from heat, the regiment arrived in some disorder. After this, they began work on constructing defences, while one squadron was detached to garrison Kasr-el-Nil; in early July they were sent on to Moascar.

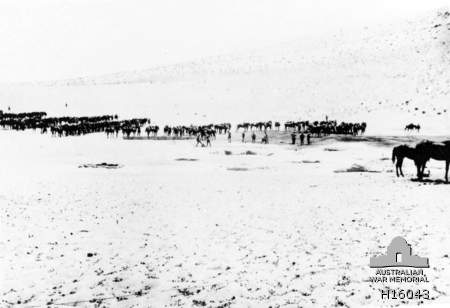
Men and horses from the 12th Light Horse Regiment rest at Mahadat, Sinai, in September 1916 following the conclusion of fighting around Romani.

Later that month, the 12th were relieved at Dueidar and moved back to Heliopolis. While there, Lieutenant Colonel Harold McIntosh took command of the regiment following Royston's elevation to temporary commander of the 2nd Light Horse Brigade. On 27 July the regiment, without its machine-gun section which had been detached to the 2nd Light Horse Brigade, was sent to Gebel Habeita to relieve the 9th Light Horse Regiment. After undertaking the first part of the journey to Seraphum by train, they marched the rest of the way. In early August, Ottoman forces launched an attack in the Battle of Romani. During this fighting, the 12th Light Horse Regiment provided flank protection, carrying out patrols, and was not directly engaged except for its machine-gun section.

In early September, the regiment moved to Bayoud where they were attached to a British column along with the 11th Light Horse Regiment, a regiment from the City of London Yeomanry, and an artillery battery. Under the command of Major General A.G. Dallas, they carried out a raid in the Maghara Hills on an Ottoman position 37 mi (60 km) away. Upon arrival, after discovering that the Ottoman force was greater than expected, Dallas decided to limit the operation to a demonstration rather than a full attack. Within this plan, the 12th was allocated the task of advancing on the right flank during the attack. They proceeded to advance across the open ground on their horses, before dismounting to ascend towards the high ground. As the Ottoman fire increased, the 12th provided covering fire with machine-guns and rifles while the 11th came forward using their bayonets to clear the defenders from the forward position. The light horsemen were then ordered to withdraw, instead of assaulting the main position.

In early October, while at Mageibra, the regiment received orders that they were to be remounted on camels and be re-designated as the "2nd Australian Camel Regiment", but largely the regiment continued to refer to itself by its old designation. This was due to a plan to convert both the 11th and 12th Light Horse Regiments to cameleers; however, it did not occur. In late October, the 12th were sent to the rear to rest, arriving at the railhead at El Ferdan on the Suez. 'A' Squadron established itself there, while 'B' and 'C' Squadrons and the Machine-Gun Section were sent to Ferry Post. During this time they undertook frequent patrols, with 'A' Squadron permanently detaching a troop to Badar Mahadat.

=== Palestine ===
In early 1917, the 4th Light Horse Brigade was reconstituted at Ferry Post on 13 February under the command of Brigadier General John Meredith. Assigned to the brigade along with the 4th and 11th Light Horse Regiments, the regiment's time of operating as a detached unit came to an end; they officially readopted the designation of 12th Light Horse Regiment at this time. For the next month they undertook training exercises before joining the advance into Palestine, while some men from the regiment were also detached to join Dunsterforce in Persia. In April, the regiment took part in the Second Battle of Gaza. Assigned the task of attacking the Atawineh Redoubt early in the morning of 19 April, the regiment dismounted about 2 mi (3.5 km) from it and advanced on foot. Initially, they made good progress and captured a ridge about 1 mi (1.8 km) from their objective without even firing a shot. As the defensive fire grew more intense, the men were forced to the ground and began fire and movement drills. Spread thinly across a 1,000 yd (900 m) front with just 500 men, the 12th was dangerously exposed as machine-gun fire began to inflict casualties, checking the Australians' advance. Nevertheless, the regiment held its position throughout the day until being withdrawn to a nearby hill that night, by which time it had suffered more than 30 percent casualties. These included the commanding officer, McIntosh, who was gravely wounded and subsequently died of his wounds. He was replaced by the second-in-command, Major Donald Cameron, who was later promoted to lieutenant colonel.

The day after the attack, the 12th Light Horse Regiment dug-in and sent out patrols in preparation for a possible Ottoman counterattack. Although they were harassed throughout the day with sniper fire, the attack never came. After three days they were withdrawn back to Shaquth, where they worked to improve defences and conducted patrols for the next fortnight before dispatching two squadrons in early May to attack an Ottoman foraging party at Esani. The attack proved unsuccessful, as the Australians' approach was spotted, allowing the Ottomans and their Bedouin workers to withdraw before they could be engaged.

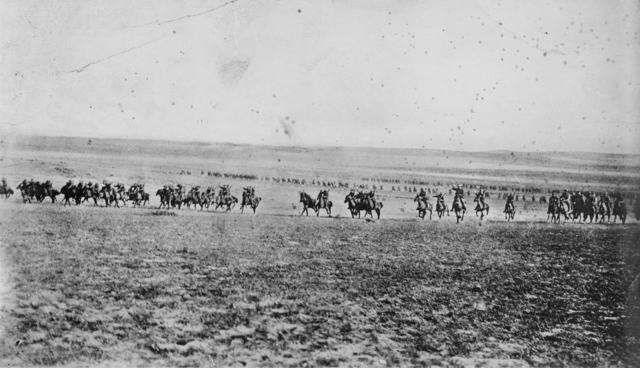
Photograph claimed to be of the charge of the 4th Light Horse Brigade at Beersheba, although it may be a re-enactment taken in February 1918.

A period of stalemate followed, during which time the regiment, along with the rest of the brigade, rotated between the forward position at Fara and other positions in support and reserve at Kukhari and Marakeb as preparations were made for a future offensive. The regiment's next major action came in October 1917. Conceived as part of an attack towards the Jerusalem to Jaffa line, the regiment took part in the Battle of Beersheba. During this battle, along with the 4th Light Horse Regiment, the 12th Light Horse carried out a successful mounted charge, advancing over open ground late in the afternoon to get under the Ottoman guns and capture the town and its vital water supplies. Late in the afternoon, the 12th Light Horse Regiment advanced, according to historian Henry Gullett, on a "squadron frontage in three lines" 300–500 yd (270–460 m) apart, with the 4th Light Horse Regiment to launch a "pure cavalry" charge, the troopers advancing with bayonets in their hands. Advancing over 6,600 yd (6,000 m), the light horsemen were subjected to rifle and machine-gun fire and artillery bombardment from the flanks and trenches to their front. Supporting artillery helped suppress the machine-gun fire from the flanks, and the speed of the charge made it difficult for the Ottoman gunners to adjust their range. The Ottoman trenches were not protected with wire and after jumping over the trenches, the light horsemen dismounted and hand-to-hand fighting followed. While most of the 4th Light Horse and some of the 12th Light Horse dismounted, the remainder stayed mounted, continuing their charge into the town. The British official historian claims "more than half the dismounted troops in the town were captured or killed," while 15 of the 28 guns in the town were captured by the Desert Mounted Corps and XX Corps. Over 700 Ottoman soldiers were captured and, more significantly for the Australians, over 400,000 litres of water secured. In achieving this, the 12th lost 24 men killed and 15 wounded; 44 horses were also killed, while another 60 were wounded or became sick.

The success at Beersheba significantly reduced Ottoman resistance, but heavy fighting continued around Gaza and elsewhere, including the Battle of Tel el Khuweilfe, and the regiment remained at Beersheba for four days to receive remounts. Gaza fell in early November and, as Ottoman forces fell back, the British Empire troops followed them in pursuit. The 12th advanced further into Palestine as part of the plan to capture Jerusalem. On 7 November, during the Battle of Hareira and Sheria, the regiment joined the 11th Light Horse Regiment in an attack in support of the 60th Division around Khurbet Buteihah, but was forced to halt their charge and dismount amidst artillery and machine-gun fire as their horses needed water. The following day, the 12th was sent to Beit Hanun to contact the Imperial Service Cavalry Brigade, before searching for water around Sin Sin and Faluje, where they captured a number of Ottoman troops before rejoining the Australian Mounted Division at Huj. On 10 November, the 12th provided support to the 11th Light Horse Regiment when they came under attack at Hill 248 by a strong Ottoman counterattack, which was turned back. After moving on to Summeil the next day, one of the regiment's squadrons received heavy fire while providing flank protection to the 54th Division as it attacked to the south of Et Tine.

Early on 14 November, in the aftermath of the Battle of Mughar Ridge, a reconnaissance patrol to Et Tine found it had been evacuated and the 12th occupied the town. In doing so, they secured a water source and a quantity of supplies, although a large amount of equipment was lost to a fire that had been set by the withdrawing garrison. The 12th then took up an observation position at El Dhenebbe to support the British flank before moving to Wadi Menakh on 18 November to water their horses. They were then ordered to launch an attack around Latron during the Battle of Nebi Samwil, but after moving to Abu Shushen where they dismounted, the regiment was recalled to Junction Station. From there, the following day amidst heavy rain they moved to Deiran. Three days later, the 12th encamped at Mejdel for a week of rest along with the majority of the Australian Mounted Division. After a brief respite, as the 4th Light Horse Brigade was sent to El Burj to relieve British forces there, the 12th went into reserve; the horses were sent back to Deiran, and dismounted patrols and reconnaissance parties were sent out.

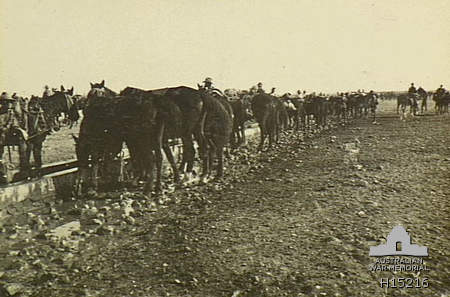
Horses from the 12th Light Horse Regiment drink at Beersheba.

In early December, the 12th relieved the Scots Fusiliers in the Judean Hills to the north of Jerusalem. Supported by artillery, the regiment advanced and on 6 December established itself along the Khed–Daty–Kureisnneh line. Upon arrival, they moved into a defensive position about 900 yd (800 m) from Ottoman positions. Initially, it had only been planned for the unit to stay there for one night and as a result most of the cold weather equipment had been left behind. Nevertheless, the stay was extended and as winter came to Judea, heavy rain set in and the temperature dropped. Redoubts were established along the front for shelter, while the men also took to caves in the hills briefly to escape the elements, although these were soon abandoned when they were found to contain lice. On 11 December, the 4th Light Horse Brigade, having been relieved by the 3rd Light Horse Brigade, was withdrawn back to Khed Daty, where they became the Australian Mounted Division's reserve formation. On 28 December, the brigade advanced to the Jurdeh–Kuddis–Nalin line to hold ground that had been captured as part of the advance on Jerusalem, and the 12th established itself at Kuddis.

In early in January 1918, the regiment received orders to move to Belah, on the coast near Gaza. For the next three months they undertook training there. In March, the 4th Light Horse Brigade, commanded by Brigadier General William Grant, was inspected by the Duke of Connaught who, according to author Kenneth Hollis, likened the "snap and automatic precision" of their ceremonial drill to "a battalion of Grenadiers". The following month they moved to Selmeh, near Jaffa, to support the attack on the Ottoman position that had been established around Jiljulah and Kalkileh on the railway line that stretched north in the direction of Haifa. Although the 74th Division made some progress on the flank, the regiment's involvement in the attack was called off due to heavy resistance and the 12th, along with the rest of the 4th Light Horse Brigade, was sent to the Jordan Valley, which had been occupied by British Empire forces. Taking up positions near Jericho, they then sent out patrols to the Jordan and the river el Auja.

=== Jordan and Syria ===
In late April 1918, the regiment joined an attack on Es Salt, which was undertaken as part of a plan to capture the village so it could be used as a staging point for a further advance towards the railway junction at Deraa. The regiment's role in the raid was to advance up the eastern side of the Jordan River to capture a crossing 19 mi (31 km) to the north of Es Salt at Jisr ed Damieh to stop Ottoman reinforcements being sent to Es Salt from Nablus. Initially, the operation met with success, and although two of the 12th's squadrons met strong resistance and were stopped at the bridge on the Es Salt track, the village was secured by dusk on 30 April by troops of the 3rd Light Horse Brigade. Throughout the night, the 4th Light Horse Brigade assumed defensive positions: the 12th in the centre with the 4th on their left and the 11th on their right. The following day, they were confronted by a force of around 4,000 Ottoman infantry along the Es Salt track, while another force of 1,000 infantry and 500 cavalry were further south, ready to force a second crossing. After coming under attack, and finding themselves hard pressed, the 4th Light Horse Brigade was forced back to the south, exposing the rear of the troops holding Es Salt. Over the course of next few days little progress was made by the British Empire troops and, despite the arrival of reinforcements, the commander of the operation, Lieutenant General Harry Chauvel, decided that it was necessary to withdraw from the position on 3 May. The regiment crossed the Jordan and two days later had returned to its previous positions around Jericho.

Throughout May the regiment constructed defences around Musallabeh in temperatures as high as 50 °C (122 °F), and flies, scorpions, spiders and snakes also infested the regiment's camp. Many men from the 12th became sick with malaria and other conditions, before they were moved to Solomon's Pools, where the climate was more bearable. In late June, the regiment manned defences in the Jordan Valley before being sent to a camp among the olive groves at Ludd in early August. While there, the regiment received cavalry training and was issued swords, along with the rest of the Australian Mounted Division.

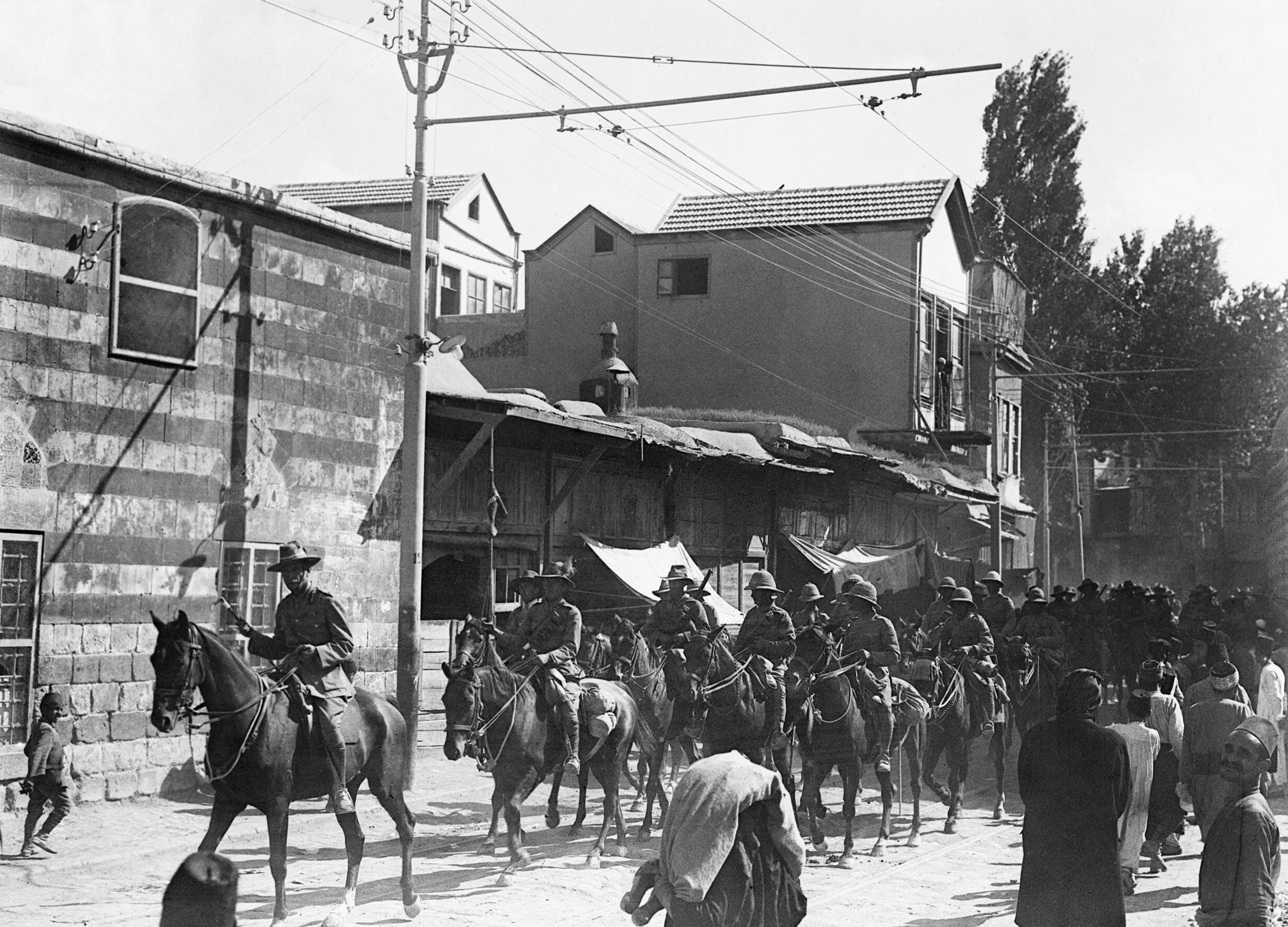
Chauvel enters Damascus on 2 October 1918.

The regiment departed Ludd on 18 September, taking up camp near Jaffa. Before dawn the next morning, the regiment led the Australian Mounted Division's advance towards Semakh and Tiberias, moving by day to a position near Nahr Iskanderun where they rested until midnight. The 12th then trotted on to Liktera, 37 mi (60 km) behind the original Ottoman front line. There the regiment rested again until midday before making for Keikur Beidas; encountering a number of surrendering Ottoman troops along the way, it arrived there in the afternoon but halted only briefly before continuing on to the mouth of the Plain of Esdraelon, where they bivouacked for the night. The next morning, the regiment moved to support the 3rd Light Horse Brigade, which had taken between 8,000 and 9,000 prisoners during the capture of Jenin. They also sent out patrols to the outlying villages and hills and established signal stations.

On 22 September, following the 4th Light Horse Brigade's relief by the 5th Light Horse Brigade, the regiment was tasked with escorting 5,000 prisoners to El Lejjun before moving to Jisr ed Mejamie, along the Jordan River near its confluence with the Sea of Galilee at Lake Tiberias. From there, in the early hours of 25 September, the 12th Light Horse Regiment, along with the rest of the brigade and one regiment from the 5th Light Horse Brigade, departed to conduct a dawn attack during the Battle of Samakh before rejoining the division's advance to Tiberias. It was still dark when the advancing Australians came under heavy rifle and machine-gun fire from German and Ottoman positions near the railway station about 0.9 mi (1.5 km) away. In response, the 11th Light Horse Regiment conducted a mounted charge that was checked just short of the objective, and one squadron from the 12th advanced along the left flank on horseback, while the other squadrons attempted to draw fire. Once close enough, the squadron from the 12th dismounted and attacked with their bayonets, which forced most of the defenders out of the village, except the Germans defending the fortified railway station house. At this point, the defenders raised a white flag of truce, and as several Australians from the 11th and 12th Light Horse advanced to take their surrender, the Germans manning the station killed them. The Australians then attacked, clearing the building, and later refused to bury the German dead, which amounted to 98, leaving their bodies to be looted by villagers. In the battle, the regiment lost one man killed and 10 wounded; losses suffered by the horses amounted to 61 killed and 27 injured.

The regiment then moved towards the high ground on the western side of the Jordan River. Mid-morning on 25 September they reached El Menarah. In the afternoon, after the garrison was seen to withdraw, they advanced in concert with a number of armoured cars and at 3:00 pm the regiment entered Tiberias, capturing 200 German and Ottoman troops and a large amount of stores. From there, on 27 September, they began the final advance to Damascus, crossing the Jordan River and, early the following day, established a divisional bridgehead around Et Min during the Battle of Jisr Benat Yakub. On 30 September, about 9 mi (15 km) from their objective, the 12th, along with the 4th, mounted a charge at Kaukab. Forming up with the 4th on their left, the regiment attacked across a maize field towards a spur near the Jebel es Aswad, advancing on a position that they believed was strongly held. In the end, the defenders did not fire a shot before withdrawing and the Australians took the position without suffering a casualty, capturing 12 machine-guns and taking 22 prisoners. The 12th then spent the night south-west of the city and the following day, 1 October 1918, it was one of the first Australian units to enter Damascus, sending patrols in ahead of the main advance. A period of guard duty followed before the regiment was withdrawn to the city's outskirts, suffering heavily from illness. Shortly after this, on 30 October, while the regiment was moving towards Homs, the Armistice of Mudros came into effect, ending the fighting.

=== Disbandment ===
Following the end of the war, the 12th Light Horse Regiment remained in the Middle East for a number of months, during which time, under the command of Lieutenant Colonel Phillip Chambers, they were used to suppress the 1919 Egyptian Uprising. During the uprising, the 12th carried out security operations to protect infrastructure in the Ismailia area. As the situation was resolved, the regiment handed back its stores and equipment in preparation for repatriation back to Australia and most of their horses were transferred to the Australian Remount Depot at Moascar. Due to concerns about costs, availability of shipping and quarantine restrictions, the decision was made that the horses would not be returned to Australia, but that they would be sold to the British Indian Army for further service, or to local Egyptians. According to Hollis, though, many were also put down by the troopers due to concerns they might be mistreated.

Mid-morning on 22 July the 12th Light Horse Regiment's personnel embarked upon the transport Morvada at Kantara. Cruising via Colombo, in Ceylon, the regiment made landfall at Fremantle on 17 August 1919. There the men were granted a brief period of leave before the ship continued on to Sydney. After stops at Adelaide and Melbourne, they arrived on 28 August, and the regiment was disbanded.

During the war, the regiment lost 67 men killed and 401 men wounded. (Note: These figures differ slightly from those provided by the Australian War Memorial, which lists: 53 killed and 401 wounded.) Members of the regiment received the following decorations: three Distinguished Service Orders (DSOs) and one Bar; five Military Crosses with one Bar; nine Distinguished Conduct Medals with one Bar; 14 Military Medals and 17 Mentions in Despatches. Two members of the regiment, Major Eric Hyman and Major Cuthbert Fetherstonhaugh, were nominated for the Victoria Cross for their involvement in the fighting around Beersheba. The awards were never approved and instead they both received the DSO.

=== Inter-war years and subsequent service ===
In 1921, the Citizens Force was reorganised to replicate the numerical designations of the AIF units and perpetuate their honours and traditions. As a result, the 12th Light Horse Regiment was re-raised in the New England region of New South Wales and headquartered at Armidale. In re-forming, the regiment drew lineage from the Citizens Forces' 12th (New England) Light Horse, which had existed parallel to the AIF light horse regiment and had remained in Australia during the war. This regiment, through a complex series of reorganisations, traced its lineage to the 6th Australian Light Horse Regiment, which had been raised in 1903 and perpetuated units that had contributed personnel to fight in South Africa during the Boer War.

During this time, the regiment was assigned to the 2nd Cavalry Brigade, along with the 15th and 16th Light Horse Regiments. In 1927, when territorial designations were adopted, the 12th Light Horse Regiment became known as the "New England Light Horse". At the same time, the regiment adopted the motto of Virtutis Fortuna Comes ("Fortune is the Companion of Valour"). Initially, the strength of part-time units was maintained through both voluntary and compulsory service, but after the election of the Scullin Labor government in 1929–30, compulsory service ended and the Citizens Force was replaced with the all-volunteer "Militia". The economic hardships of the Great Depression and reduced training opportunities resulted in a decline in the number of volunteers and consequently a number units were disbanded or amalgamated.

Amidst the austerity of the inter-war years, the regiment remained in existence until 1 October 1936 when it was merged with the 24th (Gwydir) Light Horse to form the 12th/24th Light Horse. These two units were later delinked in 1938 as the Militia was expanded following increased political tensions in Europe. In March 1942, during the Second World War, the 12th Light Horse was converted to a motor regiment, known as the 12th Motor Regiment. In September 1942, it was redesignated the 12th Armoured Car Regiment, and assigned to the 3rd Armoured Division. During this period a process of mechanisation resulted in the last of the light horse units giving up their horses. Throughout 1943, the Australian Army was faced with a manpower shortage and as the Japanese threat to mainland Australia decreased many Militia armoured units were broken up and their personnel sent to other units as reinforcements. As a result, the regiment was disbanded on 19 October 1943, having only undertaken garrison duty within Australia.

When Australia's part-time military force was reformed in 1948 as the Citizens Military Force, the regiment was not re-raised in its own right, although an amalgamated unit known as the 12th/16th Hunter River Lancers was established. Through this unit the 12th Light Horse Regiment's honours and traditions are perpetuated.

== Alliances ==
The 12th Light Horse Regiment held the following alliances:

- United Kingdom – The King's Colonials (Yeomanry);
- United Kingdom – Royal Scots Greys.

== Battle honours ==
The 12th Light Horse received the following battle honours:

- South Africa 1899–1900; (Note: Inherited through predecessor units, having been originally awarded in 1908 to the 6th Australian Light Horse Regiment (New England Light Horse).)
- First World War: Gallipoli 1915, Suvla, Sari-Bair, Egypt 1915–1917, Rumani, Palestine 1917–1918, Gaza–Beersheba, El Mughar, Nebi Samwill, Jerusalem, Jordan (Es Salt), Megiddo, Sharon, Damascus. (Note: This list differs from that of Hollis who details the regiment's battle honours as: South Africa 1899–1900, Suvla, Sari Bair, Gallipoli 1915, Nebi, Samwill, Jerusalem, Jordan (Es Salt), Megiddo, Sharon, Damascus, Palestine 1917–1918.)

== Commanding officers ==
The following is a list of the 12th Light Horse Regiment's commanding officers from 1915 to 1919:

- Lieutenant Colonel Percy Abbott (1915); (Note: Following the end of the war, Abbott resumed command of the regiment after it was re-raised as a part-time Citizens Forces unit, remaining in command until 1929.)
- Lieutenant Colonel John Royston (1916); (Note: Royston was a South African-born officer who had fought during the siege of Ladysmith and later commanded the Western Australian Mounted Infantry during the Boer War. Later he served during the Zulu Rebellion before organising the Natal Light Horse upon the outbreak of the First World War. After commanding the 12th Light Horse, Royston attained the rank of brigadier general and commanded the 2nd Light Horse Brigade temporarily, before taking command of the 3rd Light Horse Brigade, leading them until October 1917 when he returned to South Africa.)
- Lieutenant Colonel Harold McIntosh (1916–1917);
- Lieutenant Colonel Donald Cameron (1917–1919);
- Lieutenant Colonel Philip Chambers (1919).

== Notes ==
Footnotes

Citations
