= Battle of Jisr Benat Yakub =

Battle between the Ottomans and the Allies during the WWI

Coordinates: 33°00′37″N 35°37′42″E

- Part of the Middle Eastern theatre of World War I
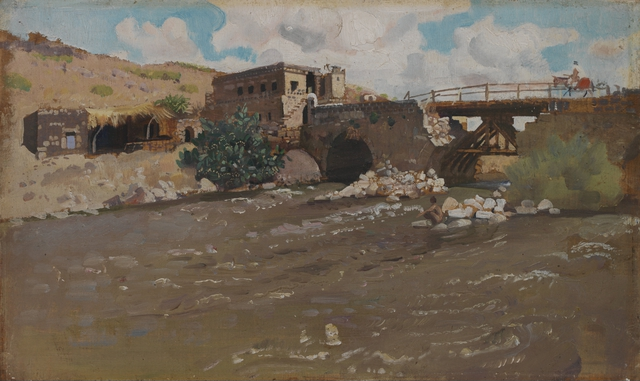
- "Jisr Benat Yakub: bridge repaired by Australian Unit" by George Lambert, shows the repaired bridge and buildings at the western end of the bridge in 1919
Date	27 September 1918
Location	Jordan River from El Min and Jisr Benat Yakub also known as Jacob's Ford and north to Lake Huleh on the main road from Jerusalem to Damascus
Result	Allied victory

Belligerents
British Empire; France	Ottoman Empire; German Empire

Commanders and leaders
(United Kingdom of Great Britain and Ireland) Edmund Allenby (Australia) Harry Chauvel (United Kingdom of Great Britain and Ireland) Henry West Hodgson	(German Empire) Liman von Sanders (Ottoman Empire) Mustafa Kemal Bey (Ottoman Empire) Cevat Çobanlı

Units involved
Egyptian Expeditionary Force; Desert Mounted Corps; Australian Mounted Division	Tiberias Group formed from surviving Yildirim Army Group garrisons which retreated from Samakh and Tiberias and reinforcements from Damascus

The Battle of Jisr Benat Yakub was fought on 27 September 1918 at the beginning of the pursuit by the Desert Mounted Corps of the retreating remnants of the Yildirim Army Group towards Damascus during the Sinai and Palestine campaign of World War I. After the Battle of Samakh and the Capture of Tiberias, which completed the Egyptian Expeditionary Force's decisive victory in the Battle of Sharon section of the Battle of Megiddo, the Australian Mounted Division attacked and captured a series of rearguard positions. The positions were held by German and Ottoman soldiers of the Tiberias Group at Daughters of Jacob Bridge, an important bridge across the Jordan River, and at fords at El Min and north towards Lake Huleh.

Remnants of the Ottoman Seventh and Eighth Armies were retreating in columns towards Damascus from the Judean Hills via Samakh, the bridge at Jisr Benat Yakub, Kuneitra, and Kaukab, pursued by the Australian Mounted and the 5th Cavalry Divisions. At the same time remnants of the Ottoman Fourth Army were retreating in columns towards Damascus along the Pilgrims' Road (the old hajj road following the even older route of the King's Highway) through Deraa, pursued by the 4th Cavalry Division.

The surviving garrisons from Samakh and Tiberias formed from remnants of the Seventh and Eighth Armies entrenched themselves on the eastern side of the Jordan River to cover the retreat of the main remnants of the Yildirim Army Group. These rearguards were successfully attacked by the Australian Mounted Division during the day, capturing a number of survivors who had not succeeded in withdrawing, to occupy the eastern bank of the Jordan River. The Australian Mounted Division, followed by the 5th Cavalry Division continued their advance towards Damascus later in the day.

== Background ==
=== Strategic importance ===
The Jordan River has only one good ford at the southern end of the Hula Basin before it gets squeezed between the Korazim block and the Golan Heights. The ford is more widely known in English as Jacob's Ford. The bridges built here in the past have led to its Arabic name, Jisr Benat Yakub, lit. Daughters of Jacob Bridge, translated to Hebrew as Gesher Bnot Ya'akov, the name under which it is known today in Israel.

This strategic site has been used by people ever since prehistoric times. The caravan route from China to Morocco via Mesopotamia and Egypt passed through the site, which has been strategically important to Egyptian, Assyrian, Hittite, Jew, Saracen Arab, Crusader knight, and Ottoman Janissary, who had all crossed the river at this place. The Crusaders built a castle overlooking the ford which threatened Damascus and was promptly attacked and destroyed by Saladin in 1179. The old arched stone bridge had marked the northern limit of Napoleon's advance in 1799.

=== Liman von Sanders and Yildirim Army Group withdraws ===
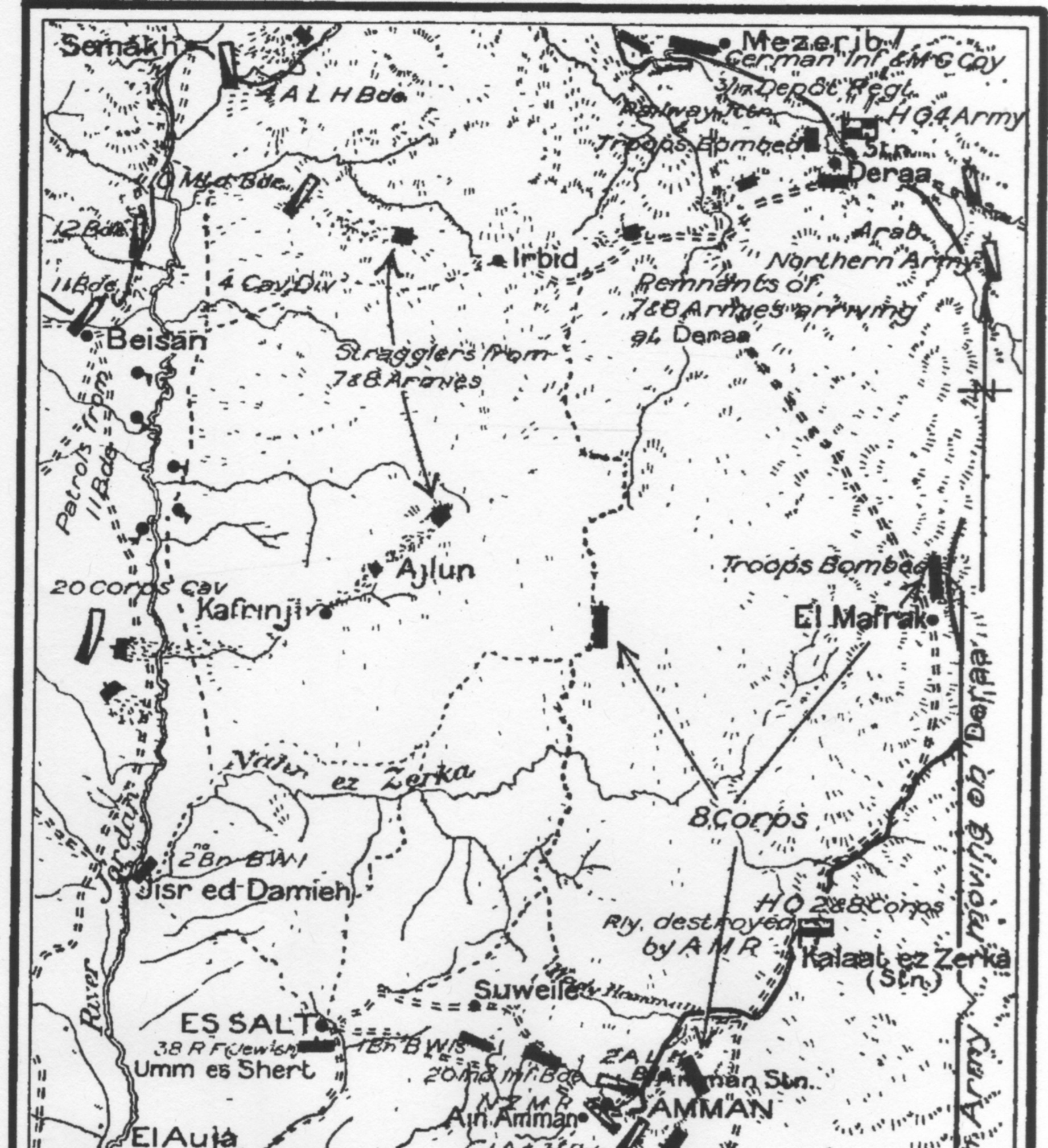
Gullett's Map 43 Detail shows positions of the retreating remnants of the Yildirim Army Group, Beisan, Irbid and Deraa with the Jordan River on the left and the Pilgrims' Road on right

The pursuit to Damascus began with the 4th Cavalry Division advance east to Deraa and then north to Damascus 140 miles (230 km) away, a day before the Australian Mounted Division with the 5th Cavalry Division in reserve, began their 90 miles (140 km) advance around the northern end of the Sea of Galilee, also known as Lake Tiberias, to Damascus. (Note: These advances have been characterised as a "race for Damascus". [Gullett 1919 pp. 39–40, Falls 1930 Vol. 2 p. 567])

After escaping from Nazareth on 20 September, Otto Liman von Sanders the commander of the Yildirim Army Group arrived at Deraa on the morning of 21 September, on his way to Damascus. At Deraa he received a report from the Ottoman Fourth Army, which he ordered to withdraw to the Yarmuk to Irbid to Deraa line.

By 26 September the Fourth Army's garrison at Amman (less the rearguard captured at Amman) had not been "heavily engaged," and "was still intact as a fighting force even though it was in rapid retreat" north along the Hejaz railway and Pilgrims Road, many miles to the east of the Jordan River towards Damascus.

Between 6,000 and 7,000 German and Ottoman soldiers remaining from the Ottoman Fourth, Seventh and Eighth Armies had managed to retreat via Tiberias or Deraa towards Damascus, before these places were captured on 25 and 27 September, respectively and were at or north of Muzeirib.

=== Australian Mounted Division ===
During the cavalry phase of the Battle of Sharon the Australian Mounted Division's 3rd Light Horse Brigade captured Jenin, the 4th Light Horse Brigade captured Samakh and during the infantry phase of the Battle of Sharon the 5th Light Horse Brigade assisted the 60th Division to capture Tulkarm.

== Prelude ==
The Australian Mounted Division followed by the 5th Cavalry Division and the Desert Mounted Corps headquarters left Tiberias at 06:00 on 27 September to begin their pursuit to Damascus. The 5th Light Horse Brigade, led the Australian Mounted Division, north along the shore of the Sea of Galilee passed "high striated clay ridges that again recalled the ridges of Gallipoli." They continue into the highlands of the Golan Heights, ideal defensive country which overlooks all the Jordan River crossings. Here they were held up for several hours at Jisr Benat Yakub (Bridge of the Daughters of Jacob) on the upper Jordan, north of the Sea of Galilee.

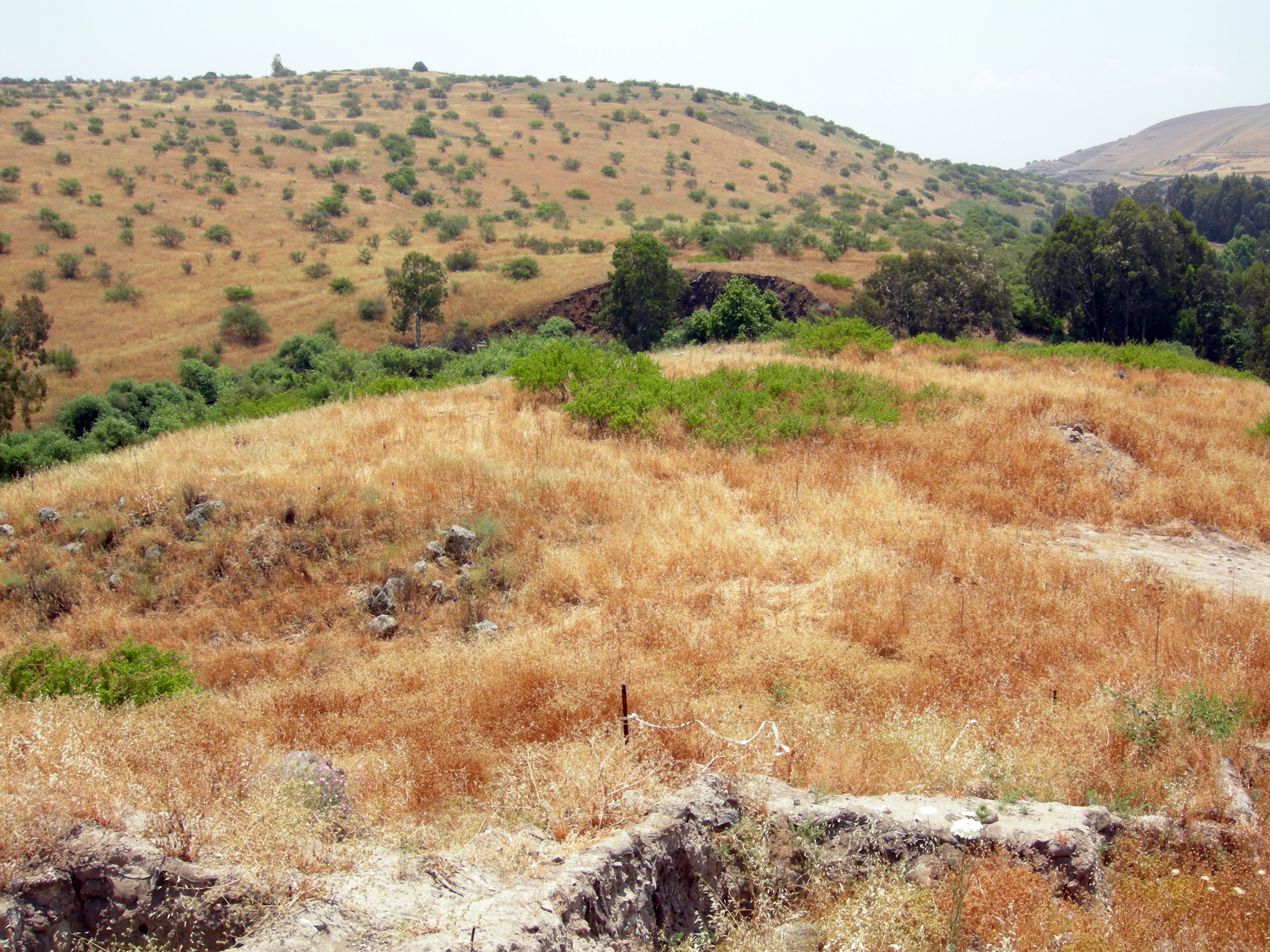
The view from the west bank of the Jordan River towards the site of the Ottoman rearguard; the sites of the Battle of Jacob's Ford

Liman von Sanders had ordered the Tiberias Group, consisting of the survivors from the garrisons at Samakh and Tiberias, to "resist vigorously" the Egyptian Expeditionary Force pursuit by establishing rearguards south of Lake Huleh. They were joined by the survivors of the Yildirim Army Group GHQ troops and garrison from Nazareth which had retreated via Tiberias, to cross the Jordan River at Jisr Benat Yakub, just south of Lake Huleh. After crossing the Jordan River, and blowing up the bridge, they prepared rearguard positions with machine guns on the east bank, overlooking the fords.

== Battle ==
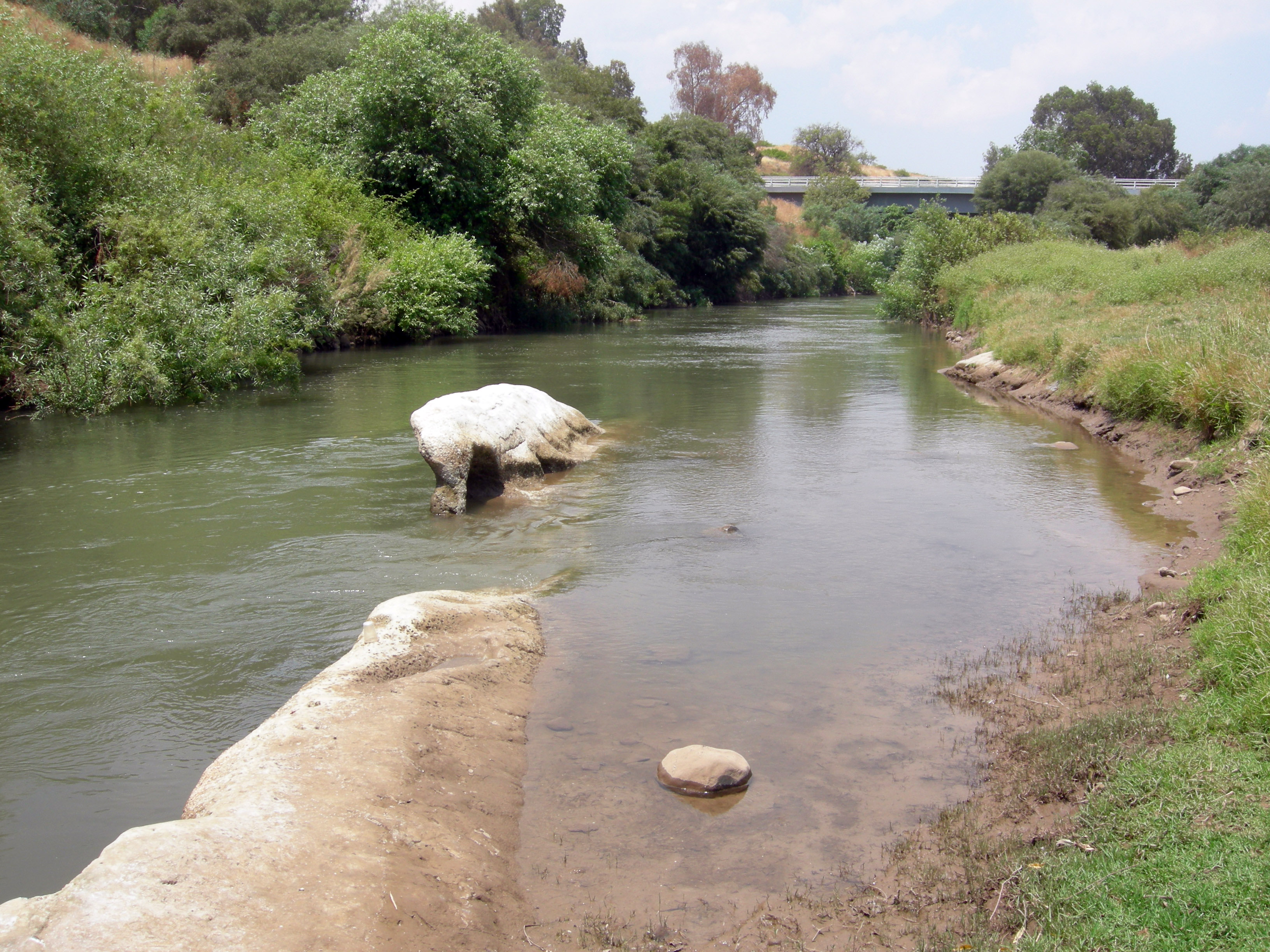
Bnot Ya'akov Bridge over the Jordan River near Jacob's Ford in 2009

The Australian Mounted Division reached the Jordan River about midday to find a rearguard including German machine gunners dominating the area from the opposite or eastern bank; sweeping the open approaches and the ford to the south of the bridge with their fire. At this point the river was deep and fast flowing with steep banks making it difficult to cross without the additional problem posed by the machine gun fire. The extensive rearguard position defending the west bank of the Jordan River stretched from the bridge at Jisr Benat Yakub north to Lake Huleh.

=== Jisr Benat Yakub ===
At Jisr Benat Yakub, the Régiment Mixte de Marche de Cavalerie (also known as the 16th Regiment Mixte de Marche de Palestine et Syrie and the 1er Régiment Mixte de Cavalerie du Lavant), composed of two squadrons of French Chasseurs d'Afrique and one squadron of Spahis, (5th Light Horse Brigade), attacked the section of the rearguard defending buildings at the western end of the bridge. They rode across open ground, dismounting in widely extended order, to make a frontal attack suffering "some loss" as no artillery support was available to support their attack.

The 4th Light Horse Brigade Machine Gun Squadron, less four machine guns with the 12th Light Horse Regiment, went into action in line with the Régiment Mixte de Marche de Cavalerie near Kusr Ataa village. At 18:40 command of the Régiment Mixte de Marche de Cavalerie was transferred to the 4th Light Horse Brigade. Well after sunset; at 20:30 the 4th Light Horse Brigade was ordered to maintain close touch with the enemy and be prepared to pursue them, if retirement began. The bridge was reported to be clear by 02:15 when the Régiment Mixte de Marche de Cavalerie followed the 12th Light Horse Regiment across the river.

=== El Min ===
The remainder of the 5th Light Horse Brigade including the 14th Light Horse Regiment and the 4th Light Horse Regiment, temporarily detached from the 4th Light Horse Brigade, went searching for a ford to the south of the bridge. They eventually swum the river in the late afternoon 1.5 miles (2.4 km) south of Jisr Benat Yakub at the El Min ford. Here they were caught in rocky ground on the opposite bank and could not proceed in the dark. They were forced to remain in position until first light.

At 17:00 the 12th Light Horse Regiment, 4th Light Horse Brigade, with four machine guns was ordered to cross the Jordan River and establish a bridgehead at El Min. By 02:15 28 September the 12th Light Horse Regiment was across the river. During the night patrols crossed the river when the 4th Light Horse Regiment continued its advance some distance to Ed Dora.

During "the crossing of the Jordan near El Min", two members of the 4th Light Horse Regiment received awards; Farrier Quarter Master Sergeant Frederick Gill earned the Military Medal for "assisting with the horses under heavy fire" and Trooper George Stockdale was mentioned in dispatches for a successful scouting mission to "reach a position from which he could view the enemy's position."

At 09:00 28 September the 4th Light Horse Regiment reverted to the 4th Light Horse Brigade. The regiment had been attached to the 5th Light Horse Brigade since garrisoning Lejjun. At the same time the Régiment Mixte de Marche de Cavalerie reverted to the 5th Light Horse Brigade.

=== Lake Huleh ===
Meanwhile, the 3rd Light Horse Brigade advanced north along the western bank of the Jordan River to reach the southern shore of Lake Huleh, searching of a suitable crossing place. In the vanguard the 9th Light Horse Regiment fired on the rearguard from the western bank, while the 10th Light Horse Regiment succeeded in crossing the river during twilight, when a squadron captured a strong rearguard position, 50 prisoners and three guns. The 8th Light Horse Regiment followed the 10th Light Horse Regiment across the Jordan at 19:00 leaving guides and a signal lamp to show the 9th Light Horse Regiment and Brigade Headquarters the place to cross the river.

The main rearguard at Jisr Benat Yakub had become aware of the threat to their lines of communications, forcing them to withdraw; many in lorries, while 53 prisoners were captured.

== Aftermath ==
=== Charge at Deir es Saras ===
The 3rd Light Horse Brigade headquarters followed the 10th and 8th Light Horse Regiments across the Jordan River; the 10th Light Horse Regiment crossing at 18:15 on 27 September to advance towards the Damascus road. By midnight the whole brigade had crossed the river and advanced 4 miles (6.4 km) to cut the Damascus road at Deir es Saras, but the main Ottoman rearguard force which had defended Jisr Benat Yakub had already retreated.

A strong rearguard was encountered defending Dier es Saras which was charged mounted, when several defenders were "run through" with swords. "B" Squadron, 10th Light Horse Regiment attacked and captured the rearguard. One troop had dismounted while the remaining troops in single file due to the rough country, moved round the flank mounted. They attacked and captured the position, 12 German, 41 Ottoman prisoners, one field gun, one machine gun, one motor lorry and an ammunition dump. Shortly before dawn the brigade arrived at Deir es Saras; "B" Squadron rejoining the regiment at 08:00 on 28 September.

=== Crossing the Jordan River ===
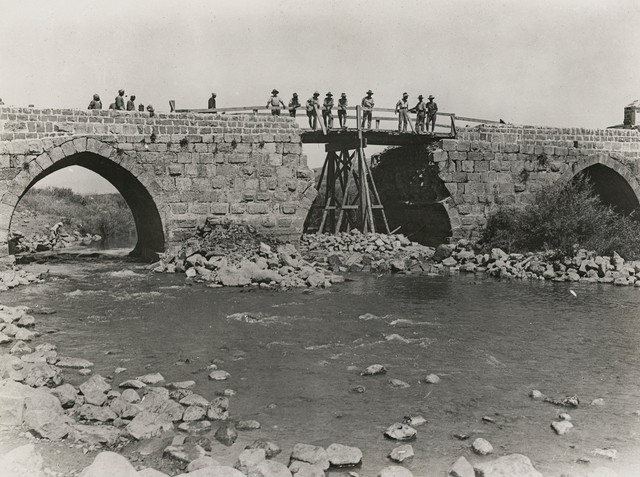
Jisr Benat Yakub repaired

While the light horse brigades crossed the Jordan River to capture the remnant rearguard which had not withdrawn in lorries, all wheeled vehicles including guns had to wait for the bridge to be repaired.

The Desert Mounted Corps Bridging Train arrived during the night, in lorries with timber. The Sappers began repairing the arch which had been completely demolished. In five hours they constructed a high trestle to bridge the destroyed span.

By daylight on 28 September the Australian Mounted Division had forded the river, and was advancing up the road towards El Kuneitra. Not long after, their wheeled vehicles and guns followed, crossing the repaired bridge. Soon after 07:00, with the 3rd Light Horse Brigade leading the Australian Mounted Division, the pursuit continued.
