= John Royston =

South African military officer

John Robinson Royston
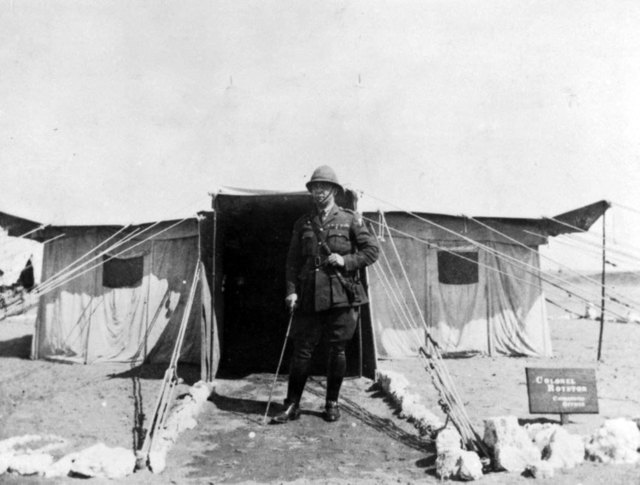
- Royston as a colonel, c. 1916–17
- Born: 29 April 1860; Durban, Colony of Natal
- Died: 25 April 1942 (aged 81); Durban, South Africa
- Military career
- Service years: c. 1879–1917
- Rank: Brigadier General
- Nickname: Galloping Jack
- Commands: Natal Light Horse; 12th Light Horse Regiment; 3rd Light Horse Brigade
- Conflicts: Zulu War; Second Boer War; First World War
- Awards: Companion of the Order of St Michael and St George; Distinguished Service Order; Mentioned in Despatches (3); Order of Saint Stanislaus, 3rd Class (Russia)

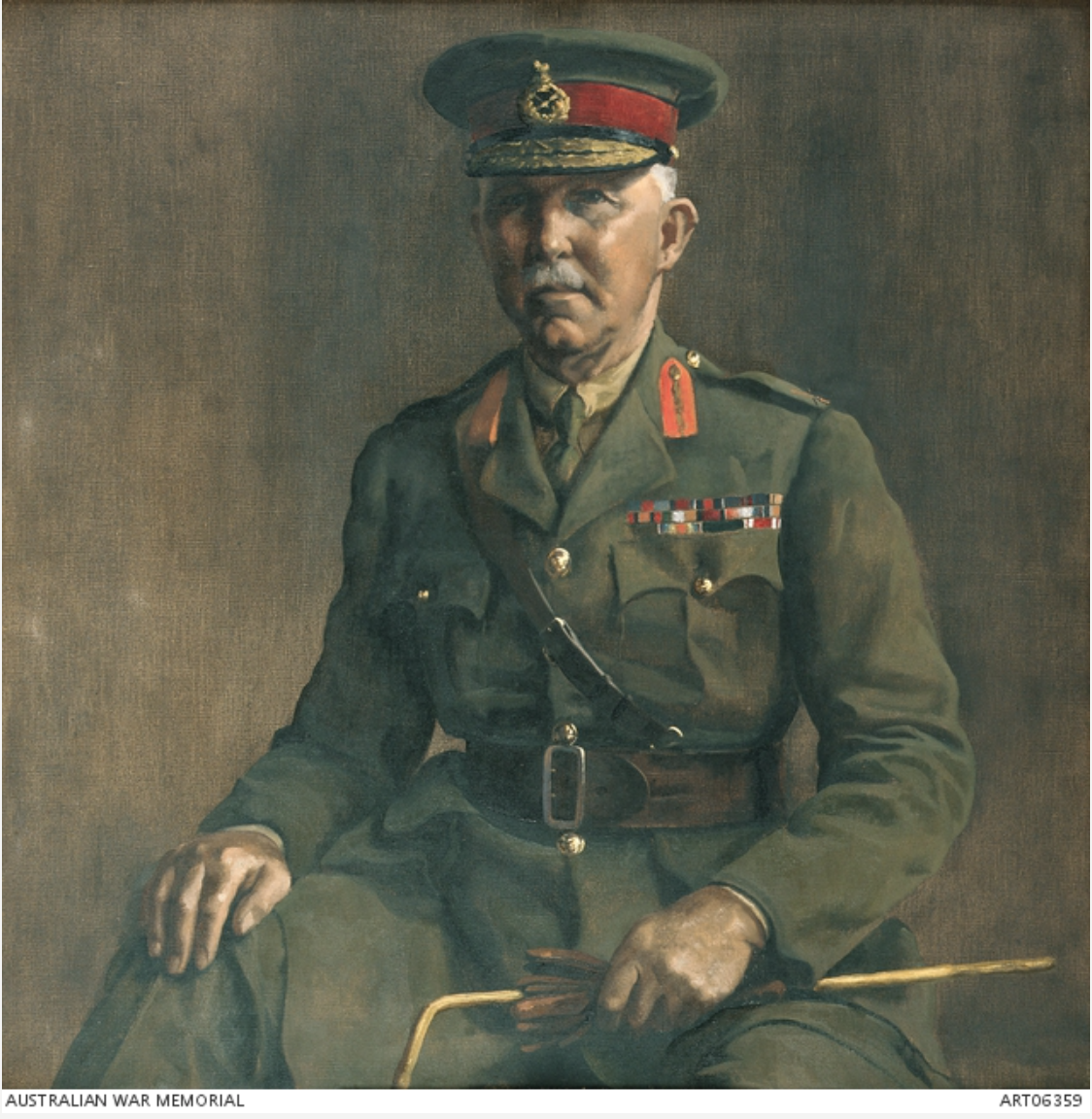
Brigadier General John Robinson Royston, 1924

Brigadier General John Robinson Royston, CMG, DSO (29 April 1860 – 25 April 1942) was a Colony of Natal-born military officer who commanded a brigade of Australian Light Horse during the First World War.

A farmer and citizen soldier, during the late 1870s and early 1880s, Royston served in the Natal Mounted Rifles as an enlisted soldier and fought during the Zulu War. During the Second Boer War he was commissioned in the Imperial Light Horse, and fought at the Siege of Ladysmith, before later commanding a contingent of the Western Australian Mounted Infantry. He was appointed a Companion of the Distinguished Service Order (DSO) for his service during the war, and received the decoration from the Prince of Wales during a large coronation parade of colonial troops in London on 1 July 1902. After the end of the war, he was made a Companion of the Order of St Michael and St George (CMG) in the October 1902 South African Honours list.

Later he served during the Zulu Rebellion before organising the Natal Light Horse—made up primarily of Australians who had remained in the Colony of Natal after the Boer War—upon the outbreak of the First World War. After seeing action against the Germans in South-West Africa, Royston was transferred to Egypt and placed in command of the 12th Light Horse Regiment, commanding them through the Battle of Romani in 1916. He was later promoted to command the 2nd Light Horse Brigade temporarily, before taking command of the 3rd Light Horse Brigade, and leading them in the Sinai and Palestine campaign against the Ottoman Empire until October 1917 when he returned to South Africa having been relieved of his command for medical reasons.
