= Charge at Kaukab =

- Part of the Middle Eastern theatre of World War I
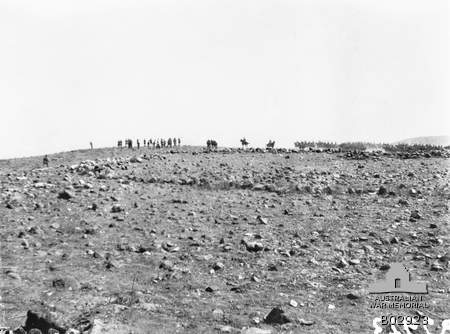
- 4th Light Horse Regiment at Kaukab
Date	30 September 1918
Location	Kaukab in the Hauran area, 10 miles (16 km) south of Damascus on the main road from Jerusalem via Quneitra
Result	Allied victory

Belligerents
British Empire; Australia; New Zealand; France	Ottoman Empire; German Empire

Commanders and leaders
(United Kingdom of Great Britain and Ireland) Edmund Allenby (Australia) Harry Chauvel (United Kingdom of Great Britain and Ireland) Henry West Hodgson	(German Empire) Otto Liman von Sanders (Ottoman Empire) Mustafa Kemal Pasha (Ottoman Empire) Jevad Pasha

Units involved
Australian Mounted Division; Desert Mounted Corps	2,500 strong force containing remnants of the Tiberias Group a portion of the 24th, 26th and 53rd Divisions and the 3rd Cavalry Division assigned to the defence of Damascus from Yildirim Army Group

Casualties and losses
Unknown	72 prisoners

The Charge at Kaukab took place on 30 September 1918 about 10 miles (16 km) south of Damascus during the pursuit by Desert Mounted Corps following the decisive Egyptian Expeditionary Force victory at the Battle of Megiddo and the Battle of Jisr Benat Yakub during the Sinai and Palestine campaign of World War I. As the Australian Mounted Division rode along the main road north, which connects the Galilee with Damascus via Quneitra, units of the division charged a Turkish rearguard position located across the main road on the ridge at Kaukab.

Following the victories at the Battle of Sharon and Battle of Nablus during the Battle of Megiddo, remnants of the Ottoman Seventh and Eighth Armies retreated in columns towards Damascus from the Judean Hills. They left rearguards at Samakh, at Tiberias and at Jisr Benat Yakub, all of which were captured by the Australian Mounted Division. Remnants of the Fourth Army retreating in columns towards Damascus along the Pilgrims' Road through Deraa, were pursued by the 4th Cavalry Division, which attacked a rearguard at Irbid.

German and Ottoman remnants of the Seventh and Eighth Armies which had formed the defeated garrisons of Samakh and Tiberias, after being pushed back again from their next defensive positions at Jisr Benat Yakub, joined part of the defenders of Damascus and entrenched themselves at Kaukab on the high ground on both sides of the main road coming from Jerusalem to Damascus via Nablus and Quneitra. Here the 4th and 12th Light Horse Regiments charged up and onto the ridge capturing part of the rearguard, while the remainder withdrew in disorder as the 5th Light Horse Brigade on the western side outflanked their positions.

== Background ==
The pursuit to Damascus began on 26 September when the 4th Cavalry Division advanced east via Irbid to Deraa which was captured by Feisal's Sherifial Forces on 27 September. Their pursuit continued with the cavalry's right flank covered by Sherifial forces, north to Damascus 140 miles (230 km) away. The Australian Mounted Division with the 5th Cavalry Division in reserve, began their 90 miles (140 km) pursuit to Damascus on 27 September around the northern end of the Sea of Galilee, also known as Lake Tiberias, via Jisr Benat Yakub and Kuneitra. (Note: These advances have been characterised as a "race for Damascus". [Gullett 1919 pp. 39–40] See also Falls 1930 Vol. 2 p. 567)

=== Liman von Sanders and Yildirim Army Group withdraws ===
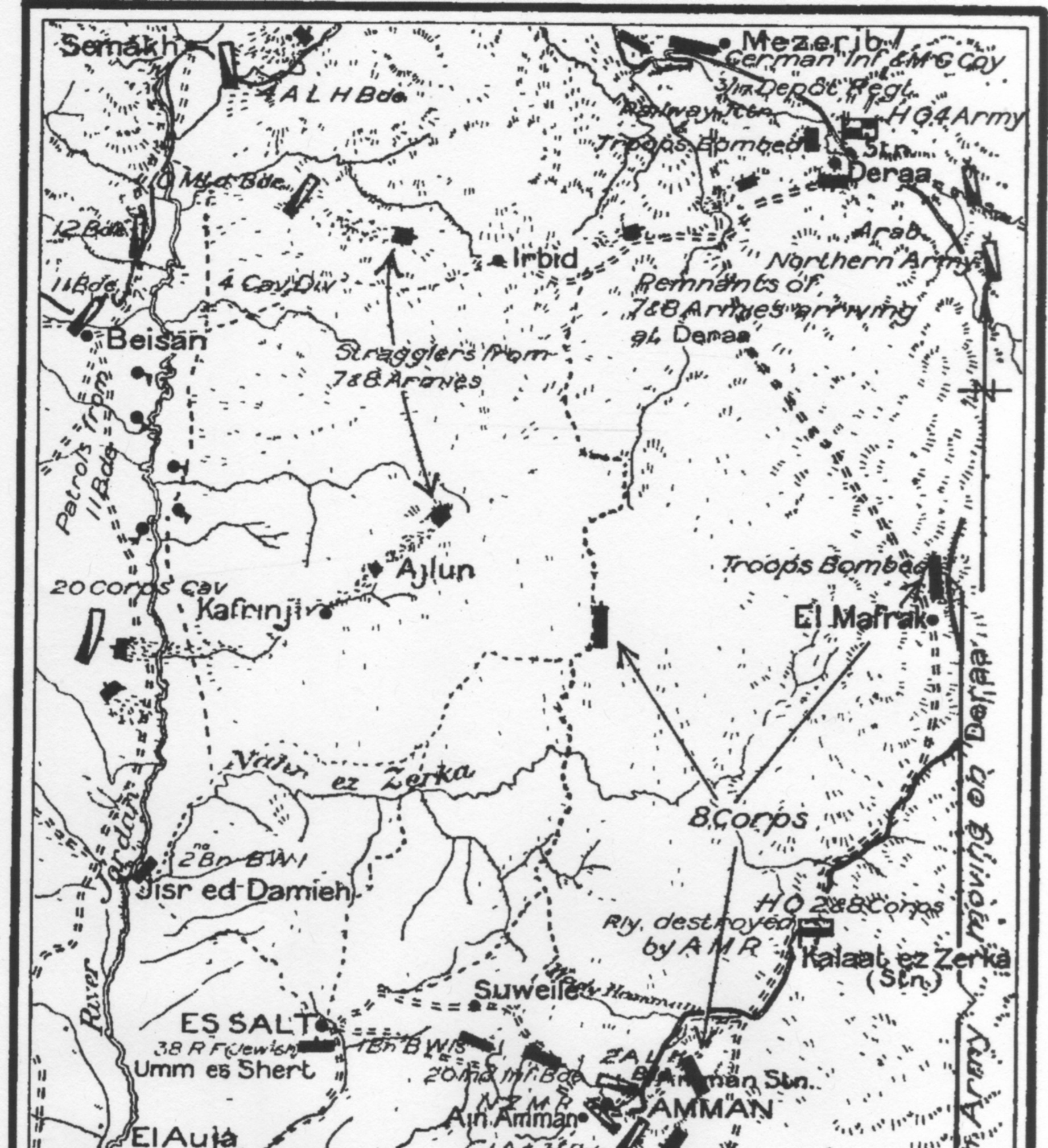
Gullett's Map 43 Detail shows positions of the retreating remnants of the Yildirim Army Group, Beisan, Irbid and Deraa with the Jordan River on the left and the Pilgrims' Road on right

By 26 September the Fourth Army's Amman garrison (less the rearguard captured at Amman) had not been "heavily engaged," and "was still intact as a fighting force even though it was in rapid retreat" north along the Hejaz railway and Pilgrims Road, some miles to the east of the Jordan River, towards Damascus.

Between 6,000 and 7,000 German and Ottoman soldiers remaining from the Ottoman Fourth, Seventh and Eighth Armies had managed to retreat via Tiberias or Deraa, before these places were captured on 25 and 27 September, respectively.

The retreating columns which moved via Deraa were at or north of Muzeirib on their way to Damascus by 27 September. When Mustafa Kemal Pasha, commander of the Seventh Army arrived at Kiswe 50 miles (80 km) from Deraa, with his army's leading troops on 29 September, Liman von Sanders ordered him to continue on north of Damascus to Rayak.

By the next morning; 30 September, the leading column of the Fourth Army consisting of an Ottoman cavalry division and some infantry, was approaching Kiswe 10 miles (16 km) south of Damascus, followed along the Pilgrims' Road by the 4th Cavalry Division 30 miles (48 km) behind.

=== Australian Mounted Division ===
During the cavalry phase of the Battle of Sharon the Australian Mounted Division's 3rd Light Horse Brigade had captured Jenin, the 4th Light Horse Brigade had captured Samakh and during the infantry phase of the Battle of Sharon the 5th Light Horse Brigade had assisted the 60th Division to capture Tulkarm.

== Prelude ==
The Australian Division orders for 30 September were to secure and hold the Kuneitra area with "a strong force, with headquarters and the bulk of its troops" while Brigadier General L. C. Wilson's 3rd and Brigadier General G. M. M. Onslow's 5th Light Horse Brigades and Bourchier's Force (4th and 12th Light Horse Regiments commanded by Lieutenant Colonel M. W. J. Bourchier) were ordered to continue the advance to the west of Damascus to cut the lines of retreat, west to Beirut and north to Homs.

At dawn Bourchier's Force took over from the 3rd Light Horse Brigade, as the Australian Mounted Division's advanced guard and by 05:00 had passed through the Sa'sa position, while the 5th Light Horse Brigade at Khan esh Shiha, with the 3rd Light Horse Brigade in reserve, rode out at 07:30 having reassembled after the engagement at Sa'sa the previous night. They were ordered to outflank Damascus moving via Qatana north-easterly along the foothills of the Kalabat el Mezze.

The pursuit towards Damascus via Daraya on the road to Damascus, continued with difficulty at first, "through narrow passes with snipers on both sides," before entering a plain when daylight allowed the advance to quickly attack an enemy column .5 miles (0.80 km) from Kaukab. The leading troop of 4th Light Horse Regiment, "broke a disorganized body of the enemy ... cutting off 180 men ... [then] groups of three or four horsemen riding at bodies of Turks ten times their own strength and calling upon them to surrender." The captured 350 prisoners, a field gun, eight machine guns and 400 rifles were collected at Khan esh Sheikh 3 miles (4.8 km) from Kaukab.

After collecting their prisoners, the 4th Light Horse Regiment arrived near Kaukab ridge when patrols found the Nahr Barbar, flowing through a valley to the slopes of Mount Hermon, easily fordable "at almost any place for mounted troops."

=== Defence of Damascus ===
Liman von Sanders ordered the 24th, 26th and 53rd Infantry Divisions, XX Corps Seventh Army and the 3rd Cavalry Division, Army Troops Fourth Army, under the command of Colonel Ismet Bey (commander of the III Corps Seventh Army) to defend Damascus, while the remaining Ottoman formations were ordered to retreat northwards. The Tiberias Group commanded by Jemal Pasha, commander of the Fourth Army was also ordered to defend Damascus.

=== Defence of Kaukab ===
The 4th Light Horse Regiment saw a strong column about 2 miles (3.2 km) long take up a defensive position on Kaukab ridge. They occupied all the commanding places from the western edge of a volcanic ridge stretching eastwards along the high ground. "From the right, a large enemy force appeared and headed across the Australians' front. They then set up a strong line of machine–gun posts ... [across] their line of advance." The Ottoman rearguard had been established on the road from Kuneitra, between Kaukab and Qatana, about 10 miles (16 km) south of Damascus and 5 miles (8.0 km) west of Kiswe. Patrols reported no sign of troops to protect the right flank of this new Kaukab position estimated to be 2,500 strong.

=== Plan of attack ===
The 4th and 12th Light Horse Regiments of Bourchier's Force with the 19th Brigade RHA in support were to advance straight on while the 5th Light Horse Brigade moved to the west between Artuz and Qatana to Daraya towards El Mezze with the 3rd Light Horse Brigade in Divisional Reserve led by Divisional Headquarters.

== Battle ==
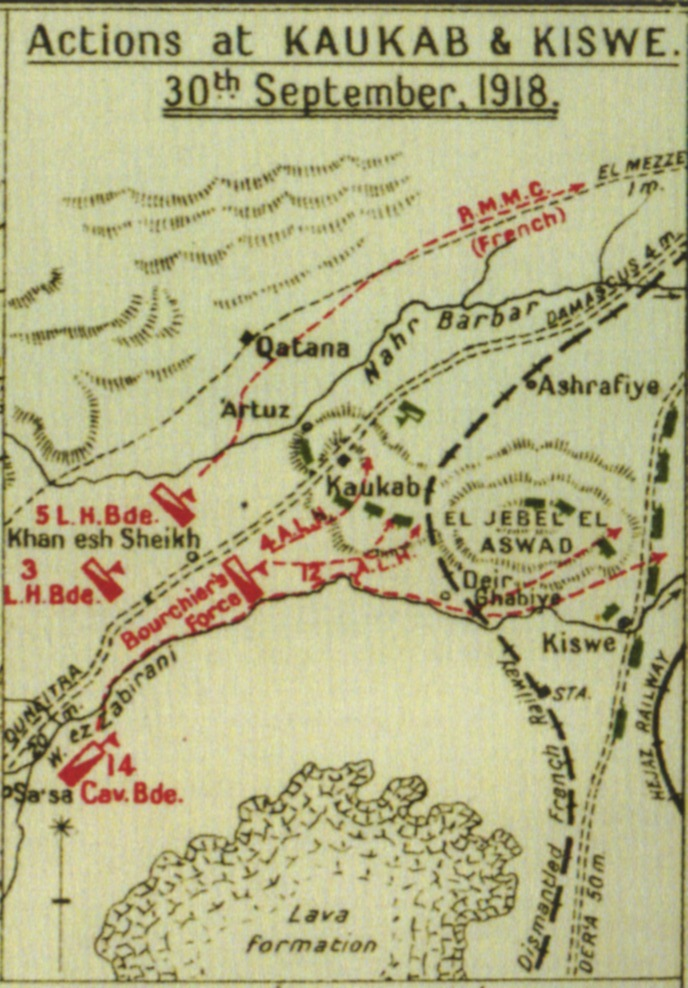
Detail of Falls sketch map 39 showing the actions at Kaukab and Kiswe

The 4th and 12th Light Horse Regiments (4th Light Horse Brigade) were deployed on the right, while the 14th Light Horse Regiment and the Régiment Mixte de Marche de Cavalerie (RMMC) (5th Light Horse Brigade) took up a position on the left with the 3rd Light Horse Brigade in the rear; "each in column of squadrons in lines of troop columns." The uncontested advance of the Régiment Mixte de Marche de Cavalerie quickly got behind the enemy's right flank; riding "up the valley, swinging westward near 'Artuz to get beyond reach of fire from the high ground at Kaukab."

After A Battery, HAC and the Notts Battery RHA opened effective fire from a hillock 2,500 yards (2,300 m) from the rearguard line, at 11:15 the 4th and 12th Light Horse Regiments charged mounted "with the sword." These two regiments rode across stony ridges and ravines to find protection behind a ridge 1 mile (1.6 km) away, where two squadrons of each regiment drew swords, leaving two squadrons in reserve, and charged up the slope towards the crest of the ridge in artillery formation.

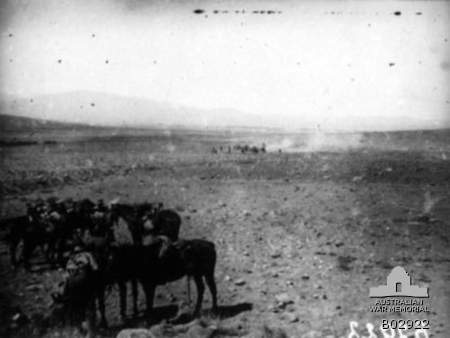
Notts Battery in action at Kaukab

I moved them off with drawn swords in line and broke into a trot and then gallop ... I never looked around but when I came down to top speed and sword at the 'charge', I could hear the noise behind me ... We expected to go through heavy machine–gunfire. I heard someone yell as we galloped along, 'Why don't you fire, you bastards?' It was hard on the nerves, waiting for the blizzard of bullets, until the men realised that the 2,500 Turks were breaking and running."

— Major Norman Rae leading "A" Squadron 4th Light Horse Regiment

When the 4th Light Horse Regiment on the left and the 12th Light Horse Regiment on the right, charged up the slope, the defenders "broke and fled into the gardens at his rear, a squadron of Turkish cavalry galloping wildly up the road towards Damascus". About 72 prisoners were captured along with 12 machine guns while large numbers of infantry retreated into nearby woods heading for Daraya.

The Ottoman rearguard had been heavily fired on by the two Australian Mounted Division batteries, and would have seen the advance of the Régiment Mixte de Marche de Cavalerie to their right rear. From Kaukab, Damascus was 10 miles (16 km) away.

== Aftermath ==
The Australian Mounted Division was ordered to move west of Damascus to block the road to Beirut and the road north to Homs. During the afternoon a redoubt defended by machine guns on the road to Damascus was attacked and captured, and refugees retreating from Damascus towards Beirut were attacked.

The Régiment Mixte de Marche de Cavalerie (5th Light Horse Brigade) continued their advance from Kaukab, riding 5 miles (8.0 km) on to the Baniyas to Damascus road beyond Qatana, and on to the southwest of El Mezze where they were heavily fired on by machine guns. The regiment dismounted to attack the position "in a narrow corridor between the enclosed gardens on the right and the hills of the Anti-Lebanon on the left," with one squadron of the 14th Light Horse Regiment following. The French regiment slowly fought their way along the Qalabat el Mezze ridge which runs parallel with the Baniyas to Damascus road, until horse artillery batteries advanced up the main road at 13:00 and commenced firing on the enemy position which silenced them.

=== Barda Gorge ===
The 5th Light Horse Brigade advanced north westwards towards the Beirut road, closely followed by the 3rd Light Horse Brigade, the latter with orders to continue round to the north of the city to block the Damascus to Homs road, but the precipitous cliffs of the Barada gorge blocked their way.

The fast flowing Abana River cascaded between banks overgrown with trees and bushes along the Barda gorge also called the Abana Pass. Along the floor of the gorge ran the main road and railway line to Beirut, which cross and re–cross the "tumbling stream" on their way out of Damascus to Beirut, with high cliffs of the desert on either side. A column many miles long crowded into the deep, narrow gorge, less than 100 yards (91 m) across.

The 3rd and 5th Light Horse Brigades (Note: Only the 5th Light Horse Brigade was involved. [Bou 2009 p. 196]) opened fire on the leading section of the column, causing large numbers of casualties, while those in the rear of the column retreated back to Damascus. Return fire by German machine gunners on top of "motor wagons and lorries, fought to the death; 370 men were killed, and fell among the dead and dying horses in the wild tumult of chaotic column."

==== 5th Light Horse Brigade ====
Following the capture by the Régiment Mixte de Marche de Cavalerie of the El Mezze position, Commandant Lebon was ordered at 15:00 to continue his regiment's advance to cut off the line of retreat towards Baalbek.

While the 5th Light Horse Brigade's 14th Light Horse Regiment advance took them along lower ground, the Régiment Mixte de Marche de Cavalerie reached the clifftops overlooking the Barda Gorge, west of Er Rabue soon after 16:30; an hour before sunset. Six machine guns of the 2nd New Zealand Machine Gun Squadron opened fire from the height on the front of the retreating column in the gorge. Those who turned back; about 4,000, were captured by the 14th Light Horse Regiment. Another six machine guns of the 5th Light Horse Brigade squadron reached the Barda Gorge higher up to the southeast of El Hame also firing on the retreating columns.

Part of our squadron, racing ahead of the screen and reaching the brink of the precipice, quickly took up positions almost invisible to the dense mass of enemy below. The head of the column was felled, and, as the unfortunates behind kept pressing forward, they were mown down as by some invisible scythe. Horses and men went down together in hundreds and died in one tangled bleeding mass. Many fell into the river and were drowned. The Germans fought desperately from the tops of lorries and from a train with their machine guns, but, seeing not where to fire, their shots were wild, and they too went down in the slaughter. The water in the MG jackets hissed, and bubbled, and steamed. The barrel in one of the guns was so hot that it bent like a crooked stick. Australian Hotchkiss guns and rifles joined in the work of destruction. Above the rattle of the machine guns and the roar of the river, the cries of anguish and despair swept up from this valley of death. With every avenue of escape cut off, the stricken survivors surrendered to their unseen foes.

— Sergeant M. Kirkpatrick, 2nd New Zealand Machine Gun Squadron attached to the 5th Light Horse Brigade

==== 3rd Light Horse Brigade ====
The leading squadron of the 9th Light Horse Regiment, arrived shortly after the Régiment Mixte de Marche de Cavalerie about 2 miles (3.2 km) to the west of their position "at a point above the Barda Gorge overlooking the village of Dummar." From here they also fired on the retreating columns.

=== Position of Desert Mounted Corps ===
By midnight on 30 September/1 October, the Australian Mounted Division was at El Mezze 2 miles (3.2 km) to the west of Damascus, the 5th Cavalry Division was at Kaukab 10 miles (16 km) to the south of the city and the 4th Cavalry Division was at Zeraqiye 34 miles (55 km) from Damascus on the Pilgrims' Road with the 11th Cavalry Brigade at Khan Deinun and the Arab Sherifial forces north east of Ashrafiye. Chauvel ordered the 5th Cavalry Division to move to the east of Damascus while the 4th Cavalry Division continued their advance from the south. Next morning, 1 October, Damascus was captured.
