= Natal Light Horse =

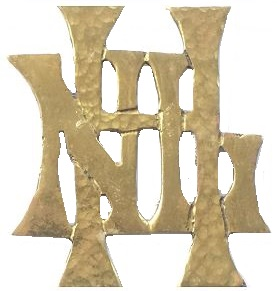
- Natal Light Horse insignia
- Active: 1914–1915
- Country: Union of South Africa
- Allegiance: British Empire
- Branch: Army
- Type: Mounted Infantry
- Size: 600 men
- Engagements: First World War

Commanders
- Notable commanders: John Robinson Royston

The Natal Light Horse was an irregular South African Armed Forces regiment formed by Colonel John Robinson Royston in August 1914 during the First World War after petitioning General Jan Smuts for special permission to do so. Opening recruiting officers in Pietermaritzburg and Durban, a full roster of six hundred men was recruited within ten days. All of those enlisted had seen previous military service, including several Australians who had served under Royston during the Second Boer War and opted to remain in South Africa at the end of that conflict.

== History ==
=== Boer Rebellion ===
Upon recruiting his full complement, Royston received orders to entrain the Natal Light Horse (NLH) for Upington, an area near the border of German South-West Africa, and, in just a few days, complete with horses and machine guns, the regiment detrained at De Aar Junction. Shortly after this arrival, the regiment was ordered to fight a rebel Boer, General Maritz, who had recruited men to the German cause and was going out in open rebellion against the South African Government. Moving north from Upington to Bechuanaland, the NLH engaged Maritz and his rebels in Kakamas mid-afternoon the next day. In this engagement, the NLH successfully captured the rebel camp but failed to capture Maritz, who, though wounded, got away.

After this action, the NLH took a position at Kheis Drift on the Orange River to stop another rebel Boer, General Kemp, and his large commando from crossing through to German territory. While at this station, Royston's observation post reported a large body of men approaching, carrying a white flag and wearing white armbands such as those displayed by the South African Forces. Taking this group as members of a detachment, he was expecting Royston to allow the group into his outpost. Unfortunately, this was an advanced guard of Kemp's commando who suddenly dismounted and began to send volley fire into the ranks of the NLH, five of whom were killed ( JA Antel, WJ Bands, CV Daly, W Speight, and EV Wentworth) and another seven wounded. The NLH response was swift. Returning fire, they simultaneously repelled the commando with losses of forty to fifty men, successfully defending Kheis Drift and preventing Kemp from crossing into German South-West Africa.

=== South West African Campaign ===
After successfully defending the Kheis Drift, the NLH entered Cape Town, where they spent Christmas before being shipped to Lüderitz in South-West Africa to join an army group in the southern sector known as Central Force.

Soon after, the Central Force began pursuing retreating forces but found that they needed more water at the wells and soaks en route. The NLH was ordered to join a flying column of three brigades of light horses and one field battery to circumvent this lack of water.

The NLH joined a rifle brigade, now commanded by Royston and also comprising the Umvoti Mounted Rifles and the 2nd Imperial Light Horse, with Lt Col. W. Park Grey taking over as Commanding officer of the NLH upon Royston's promotion to Brigadier. Leaving Aus on 15 April 1915, the flying column began an epic pursuit that covered 185 kilometres (115 mi) of rugged terrain in just four days. It then travelled via Kubis to Bethanie, Bescondermaid, and Berseba, arriving at Grudorn on 26 April 1915.

=== Action at Gibeon ===
Discovering that the Germans, unaware of the nearby Flying Column, were planning on leaving Gibeon that night, Central Force moved at speed to trap the Germans. Arriving at Gibeon undetected, Central Force opened the attack by blowing up the railway line to Windhoek sending Royston's rifle brigade in after the demolition team with orders to cut the German line of retreat. Reconnaissance by this unit was poor and they were ambushed by an enemy machine gun detachment who wreaked havoc on the South African troops. In the ensuing confusion, a squadron of the NLH was forced to surrender, and the remainder of the brigade withdrew to await daybreak. Believing they had defeated the broader South African force, the Germans did not immediately withdraw from Gibeon, allowing another Central Force Brigade to begin an attack from the south. A running fight ensured. Meantime, Royston had re-mustered his troops and rejoined the attack, forcing the Germans, who had lost a quarter of their force to casualties, their artillery and machine guns, to make good their escape. The South Africans lost 24 men killed but recovered the captured squadron of the NLH.

=== Disbandment ===
The action at Gibeon cleared the region of German forces, thus reducing the German threat. With the bulk of the resistance in South-West Africa ending by May 1915, the NLH ceased to take part in any further fighting and remained camped at Fish River where they enjoyed shooting game. In June 1915, the regiment was shipped back to Cape Town and then returned to Pietermaritzburg by rail, where it was disbanded and all men discharged. Royston, however, was still keen to help the British cause and, with the support of friends in Pietermaritzburg, raised funds that enabled him to recruit a contingent of men to travel overseas to assist Great Britain. This contingent, which included a number of those who fought with him in the NLH, was shipped to London. Upon arrival, however, Royston was persuaded by the British Prime Minister that the concept of an independent regiment was not feasible due to the high attrition rates on the Western Front. As such, Royston's Horse never formally existed as a fighting unit, with the bulk of the recruits being dispersed into London-based regiments and Royston being sent to Palestine to take command of the 3rd Australian Light Horse Brigade.
