= Battle of Aleppo (1918) =

Battle fought during World War I

- Part of the Middle Eastern theatre of World War I
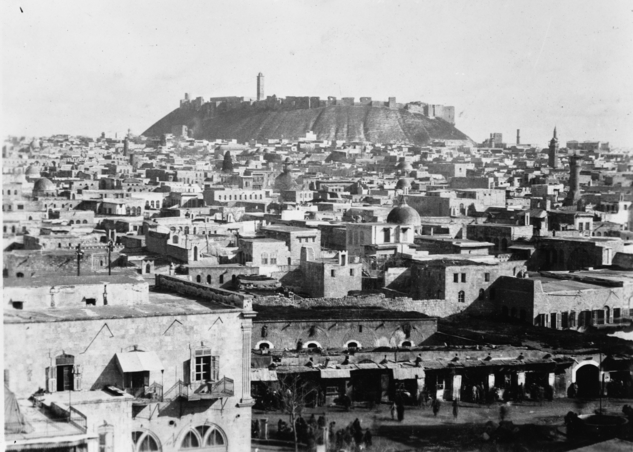
- Aleppo c. 1918 with the Citadel in the background
Date	25 October 1918
Location	Aleppo city, Aleppo Vilayet, Ottoman Empire 36°13′32″N 37°9′18″E
Result	Allied victory

Belligerents
British Empire; Australia; Hejaz	Ottoman Empire; German Empire

Commanders and leaders
(United Kingdom of Great Britain and Ireland) Edmund Allenby; (Australia) Harry Chauvel; (Arab Revolt) Faisal bin Hussein	(Ottoman Empire) Mustafa Kemal Pasha; (German Empire) Otto Liman von Sanders

Strength
Sherif Nasir and Nuri Bey's Forces	Remnants of the Yildirim Army Group

The Battle of Aleppo was fought on 25 October 1918, when Prince Feisal's Sherifial Forces captured the city during the Pursuit to Haritan from Damascus, in the last days of the Sinai and Palestine Campaign in the First World War.

After the British Empire's victory at the Battle of Megiddo the remnants of the Ottoman Empire's Yildirim Army Group from Amman was pursued by Prince Feisal's Sherifial Force which captured Deraa on 27 September, on the right flank of the 4th Cavalry Division. Meanwhile, the pursuit by the Australian Mounted Division followed by the 5th Cavalry Division of Yildirim Army Group remnants retreating from the Judean Hills, captured Damascus on 1 October 1918, many thousands of German and Ottoman prisoners and many miles of formerly Ottoman Empire territory. A remnant force of Yildirim Army Group managed to escape Damascus, to concentrate at Rayak before retreating back through Homs and Hama towards Aleppo. Huge losses in Desert Mounted Corps from sickness, delayed and depleted their pursuit from Damascus which was continued by 24 cars in three batteries of armoured cars, and three light car patrols armed with machine guns. They were supported by the 15th Imperial Service Cavalry Brigade of the 5th Cavalry Division with the remainder of the division following.

Having covered the right flank of the pursuit to Damascus, Prince Feisal's Sherifial Force continued north along the Hejaz railway to arrive outside Aleppo. After attacking a strong rearguard defence to the south of the city earlier in the day, under cover of darkness bypassed those entrenchments to enter Aleppo, where hand-to-hand fighting in the streets continued for most of the night. The city was captured by the Sherifial forces by morning.

== Background ==
Following the comprehensive success of the Battle of Megiddo, Sir Henry Wilson, Chief of the Imperial General Staff (CIGS) at the War Office encouraged General Allenby commanding the Egyptian Expeditionary Force with the idea that the EEF could do anything and asked him to consider a cavalry raid to Aleppo. Wilson added that the War Cabinet was prepared to take full responsibility for any unsuccessful outcomes.

About 19,000 Ottoman soldiers had retreated northwards by 1 October, no more than 4,000 of whom were equipped and able to fight. Liman von Sanders transferred his headquarters to Baalbek and ordered the remnants of Yildirim Army Group from Haifa and Deraa to concentrate at Rayak. The 146th Regiment was the last formation to leave Damascus on 30 September. After hearing the Barada Gorge was closed von Hammerstein left Damascus by the Homs road, following the III Corps, the 24th Division and the 3rd Cavalry Division to Rayak where even remnants of the 43rd Division of the Second Army which had not been involved in fighting, were "infected with panic." Only the remnants of von Oppen's Asia Corps and the 146th Regiment marching to Homs remained "disciplined formations" by 2 October.

Lieutenant General Harry Chauvel's Desert Mounted Corps at Damascus was already 150 miles (240 km) away from its main supply base while Aleppo was a further 200 miles (320 km) away. Allenby was prepared to advance only in stages as supply and geography dictated. He estimated on 25 September that there were 25,000 enemy troops in the Aleppo and Alexandretta area.

Aleppo has been in existence since the Hittite era, also known as Halab since the transition from the Middle to the Late Bronze Age during the second millennium BC. The city had been captured by Arabs in 646, occupied by the Seljuk Turks in 1085 and incorporated into the Ottoman Empire in 1516. By the beginning of the First World War it had a population of 150,000. Situated on the Anatolian frontier, 200 miles (320 km) north of Damascus, Aleppo was in 1918 not far from the strategically important railway junction of the Palestine and the Mesopotamian railway systems at Mouslimie Junction.

== Prelude ==
Liman von Sanders ordered Mustafa Kemal to defend Aleppo, while he withdrew his headquarters and the German troops further north, without much hope of "holding anything south of the Taurus Mountains."

=== British Empire force ===
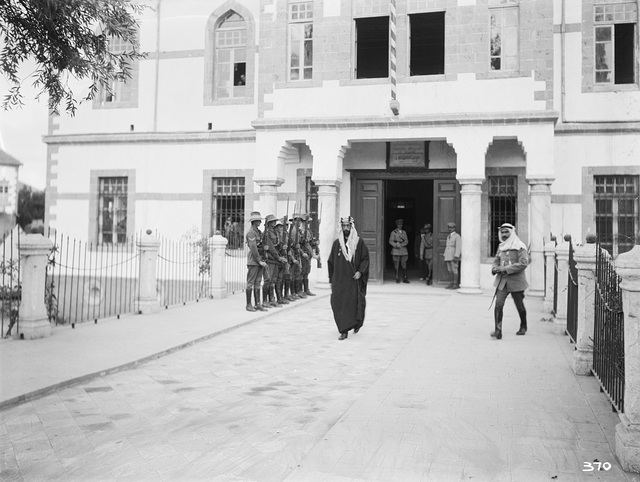
Prince Feisal leaving Chauvel's Desert Mounted Corps Headquarters in Damascus

This force which conducted the pursuit was made up of Prince Fisal's Sherifial Force; one column of 1,500 commanded by Colonel Nuri Bey and a second column of 1,500 commanded by Sherif Nasir, the 2nd, 11th and 12th Light Armoured Motor Batteries and the 1st (Australian), 2nd and 7th Light Car Patrols consisting of 24 armoured cars, and the 5th Cavalry Division's 15th Imperial Service Cavalry Brigade which accompanied the armoured cars to Hama on 21 October, while the 13th and 14th Cavalry Brigades followed in support.

The 5th Cavalry Division and the armoured cars were organised into two columns. Column "A" consisted of the 5th Cavalry Division's headquarters, all the armoured cars and the 15th Imperial Service Cavalry Brigade. The 13th and 14th Cavalry Brigades formed Column "B."

=== Yildirim Army Group defenses ===
Aleppo was garrisoned at the time by 4,000 Ottoman troops with about 20,000 in the city and nearby. This force was organised by Mustapha Kemal and Nehed Pasha commander of the Second Army to defend the city. With his headquarters at Katma, Mustapha Kemal deployed four divisions south of the city. The newly reorganised 1st and 11th Divisions of the newly created Ottoman XX Corps, (brought up to strength of between 2,000 and 3,000 soldiers "by drafts and a reinforcement of one complete regiment from Turkey"), and the 24th and the 43rd Divisions held strong entrenched positions.

Mustapha Kemal ordered the weaker 41st Division to defend Alexandretta north west of Aleppo while the 44th Division was in reserve north of the Gulf of İskenderun with the 23rd Division at Tarsus. The 47th Division may also have been in this area. All the surviving German troops had been withdrawn and were concentrated near Tarsus. The Fourth Army's headquarters, the 48th, 3rd Cavalry and Composite Divisions, the Seventh Army's 26th and 53rd Divisions along with the Eighth Army's 7th, 16th, 19th, 20th and 46th Divisions had all been destroyed or dissolved.

=== Armoured car reconnaissance 23 October ===
The pace of the cavalry and armoured car pursuit, was dictated by supplies of petrol and ration and the stamina of the horses, with aircraft reconnaissances scouting ahead to locate enemy forces.

From Hama, a column of armoured cars carried out a reconnaissance towards Aleppo, leaving behind the 15th Imperial Service Cavalry Brigade. They attacked some enemy cavalry at Khan Tuman, about 10 miles (16 km) south of Aleppo before encountering between 2,000 and 3,000 entrenched Ottoman infantry of the 1st and 11th Divisions, holding a defensive position across the road through Ansarie and Sheikh Said 3 miles (4.8 km) south of the city. Aerial and ground reconnaissances established the size of the rearguard and identified a further 6,000 or 7,000 soldiers holding Aleppo.

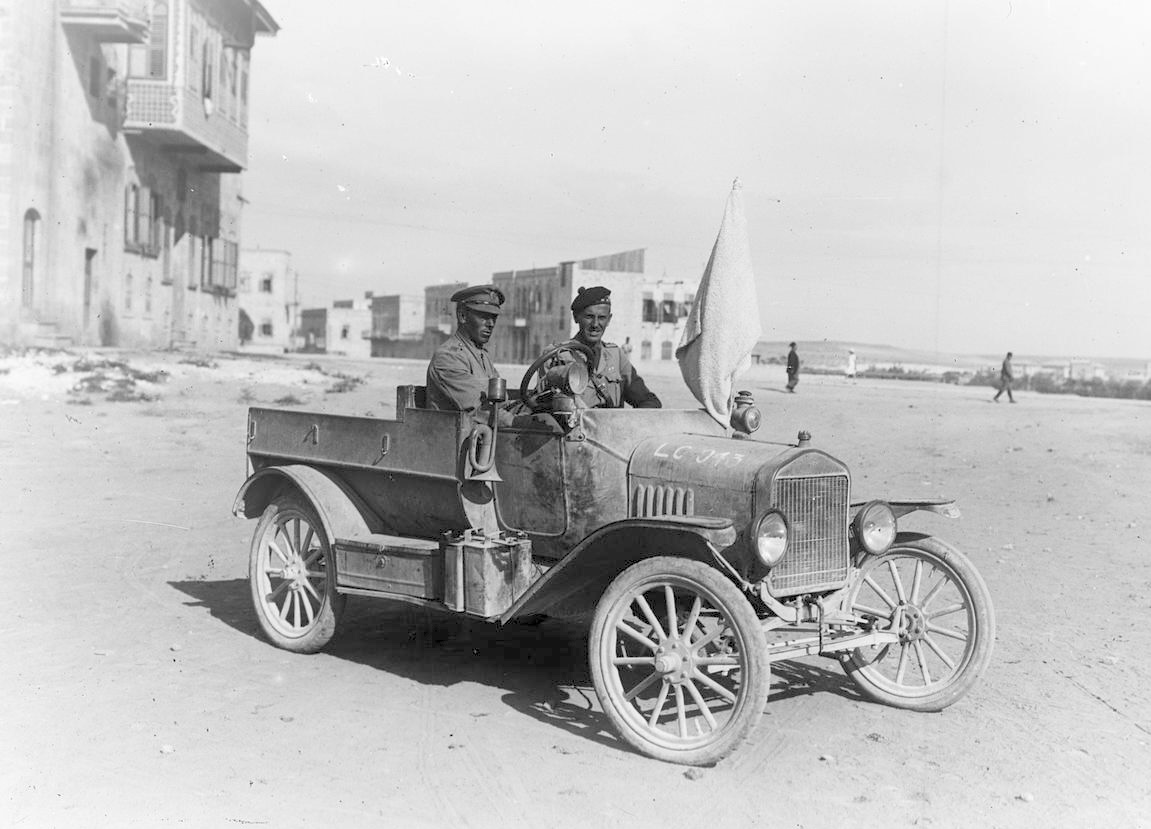
Captain Macintyre, commander of the 7th Light Car Patrol with the flag of truce used on 23 October

Major General H. J. Macandrew, commanding 5th Cavalry Division, sent Captain R. H. M. McIntyre commanding 7th Light Car Patrol under a flag of truce with a demand for the surrender Aleppo, which was rejected by Mustapha Kemal. Subsequently, the armoured cars attempted a reconnaissance in a northwesterly direction looking for a way through the rocky hills to the southwest of Aleppo, towards the Alexandretta road. The country was found to be too rough for cars and they withdrew back to Khan Tuman to bivouac.

== Battle ==
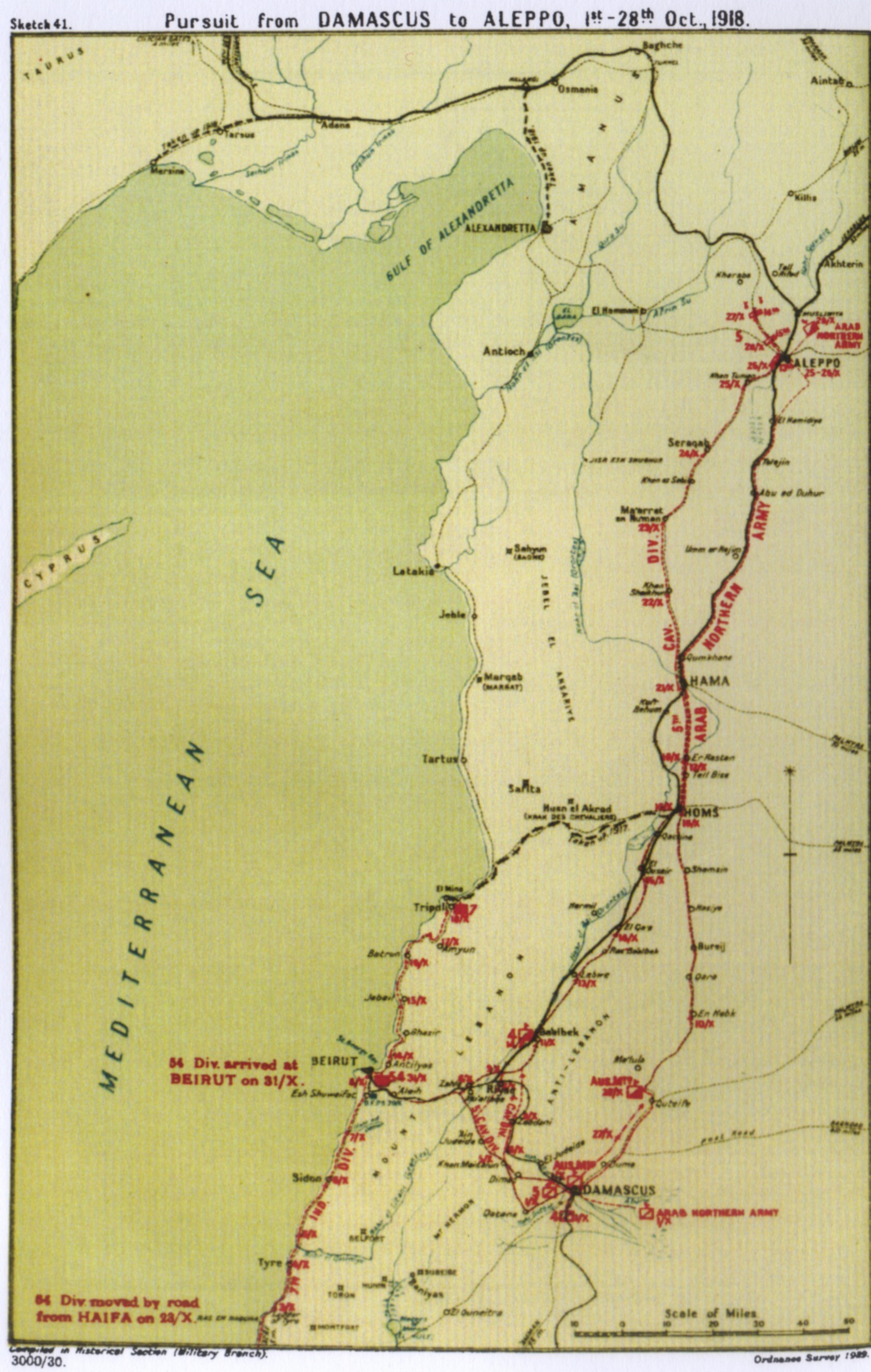
Falls Sketch Map 41 Pursuit from Damascus to Aleppo 1 to 28 October 1918

While the armoured cars waited for reinforcement by the 15th Imperial Service Cavalry Brigade on 24 and 25 October, they continued to reconnoiter the Ottoman defences south of Aleppo. The Sherifial Force commanded by Nuri Bey had advanced along the Hejaz railway on the right flank of the 5th Cavalry Division. Nuri Bey launched an attack, which may have included armoured cars, on the entrenched Ottoman position south of Aleppo on 25 October. This Sherifial Force was driven back by heavy fire from guns, machine guns and rifles all along the line of Mustapha Kemal's defences.

Nuri Bey's Sherifial Force was joined by a second Sherifial Force of 1,500 Hejaz Arab troops commanded by Sherif Nasir which Prince Feisal had ordered to advance from Homs to Aleppo. Meanwhile, the 15th Imperial Service Cavalry Brigade caught up with the armoured cars at Zi'bre 13 miles (21 km) south west of Aleppo. They relieved the armoured cars on outpost duty during the evening of 25 October while Column "B" of the 5th Cavalry Division reached Seraikin about 30 miles (48 km) south of Aleppo.

Macandrew planned an attack on the city from three sides to take place on 26 October. The armoured cars were to attack along the road from the south, Prince Feisal's Sherifial forces were to attack from the east while the 15th Imperial Service Cavalry Brigade moving round to the west of Aleppo was to cut the Alexandretta road. However, during the night of 25 October, Nuri Bey's Arab Sherifial Force attacked the city from the east, and the Arab force commanded by Sherif Nazir advanced round the entrenched Ottoman defences, entered the city to make contact with supporters.

Hand–to–hand fighting occurred in the streets during the night. In the confusion, Mustapha Kemal withdrew his headquarters out of the city, losing touch with his force defending the entrenchments to the south of Aleppo. By the morning of 26 October these defences were deserted. Aleppo had been captured by the Sherifial Forces by 10:00 on 26 October, having suffering 60 killed. MacAndrew arrived shortly after with the armoured cars.

== Aftermath ==
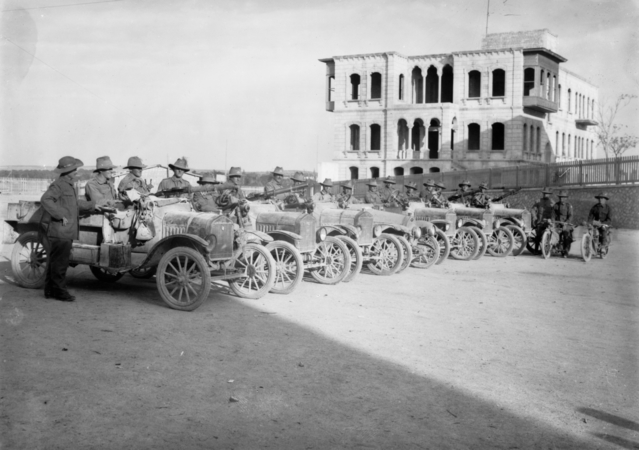
No. 1 Australian Light Car Patrol at Aleppo railway station

Part of Macandrew's preempted attack on Aleppo, went ahead at 07:00 on 26 October when the Jodhpore and Mysore lancer regiments of the 15th Imperial Service Cavalry Brigade without artillery support, but with a subsection of the 15th Machine Gun Squadron, advanced to the Alexandretta road on the edge of Aleppo. They continued on to Haritan where they twice charged a rearguard but they were strongly resisted forcing the cavalry to eventually retire. The Ottoman force also retired to establish a rearguard position at Deir el Jemal with an extensive 25 miles (40 km)-long line of defence 4 miles (6.4 km) behind the Deir el Jemal position.

The Ottoman forces now defending what remained of the Ottoman Empire consisted of the remnant of the Seventh Army commanded by Mustafa Kemal which had escaped the Megiddo battlefield, the captures of Damascus and Aleppo, was now deployed to the north and northwest of Aleppo with the Second Army of about 16,000 armed troops commanded by Nihad Pasha to the west in Cilicia while the Sixth Army with another 16,000 armed troops commanded by Ali Ihsan, which had been withdrawn from Mesopotamia was to the northeast around Nusaybin.

A cemetery for the British and Commonwealth casualties of WWI and WWII is located in an area near Sheikh Maqsoud, which had later some maintenance work during the Syrian civil war.
