= Kafr Hamrah =

Kafr Hamrah كفر حمرة
- Town
- Location within Syria
- Coordinates: 36.252649°N 37.079115°E
- Country: Syria
- Governorate: Aleppo
- District: Mount Simeon
- Subdistrict: Huraytan

Population (2004)
  - Total: 10,696
- Time zone: UTC+2 (EET)
  - Summer (DST): UTC+3 (EEST)

Kafr Hamrah (Arabic: كفر حمرة, also spelled Kfar Hamra) is a village in northern Syria, administratively part of the Aleppo Governorate, in the northwestern suburbs of Aleppo. Nearby localities include nahiya ("subdistrict") center Huraytan to the north, Anadan to the northwest and Maarat al-Atiq and Babis to the west. According to the Syria Central Bureau of Statistics (CBS), Kafr Hamrah had a population of 10,696 in the 2004 census.
