= 5th Cavalry Division (India) =

2nd Mounted Division 5th Cavalry Division
- Active: April 1918 – April 1920
- Country: India
- Branch: British Indian Army
- Type: Cavalry
- Size: Division
- Engagements: World War I: Palestine 1918; Affair of Abu Tellul; Battle of Megiddo; Capture of Damascus; Occupation of Aleppo

Commanders
- Notable commanders: Maj.-Gen. H.J.M. Macandrew

The 2nd Mounted Division was a cavalry division that served as part of the Egyptian Expeditionary Force in Palestine in World War I. It was formed in April 1918 when three brigades already in Palestine were merged with elements of the 2nd Indian Cavalry Division withdrawn from the Western Front. In July 1918, the division was renamed as the 5th Cavalry Division. It remained in Palestine after the end of the war on occupation duties until finally broken up in 1920.

== Formation ==
=== 2nd Mounted Division ===
In March 1918, the 2nd Indian Cavalry Division was broken up in France. The Canadian (Canadian Cavalry Brigade) and British units (notably 7th Dragoon Guards, 8th Hussars and N and X Batteries RHA) remained in France and the Indian elements were sent to Egypt.

By an Egyptian Expeditionary Force GHQ Order of 12 April 1918, the mounted troops of the EEF were reorganised when the Indian Army units arrived in theatre. On 24 April 1918, the 2nd Mounted Division was formed on the Indian Establishment. (Note: British Indian Army standard whereby brigades only retained one British regiment or battalion and most support units were Indian (artillery excepted).) This new formation should not be confused with the original 2nd Mounted Division that saw action in the Gallipoli Campaign, though the 5th and 7th Mounted Brigades served in both.

- the 5th Mounted Brigade was transferred from the Australian Mounted Division and merged with elements of the 3rd (Ambala) Cavalry Brigade
- the 7th Mounted Brigade (which had been acting in an independent role) was merged with elements of the 9th (Secunderabad) Cavalry Brigade
- the Imperial Service Cavalry Brigade (which had been on service in Egypt and Palestine since 1914) joined as the division's third brigade
- two of the Yeomanry Regiments were merged (1/1st Warwickshire Yeomanry of the 5th Mounted Brigade and the 1/1st South Nottinghamshire Hussars of 7th Mounted Brigade) to form B Battalion, Machine Gun Corps; it was posted to France, arriving in June. The 1/1st Queen's Own Worcestershire Hussars became the XX Corps Cavalry Regiment. They were replaced by Indian Cavalry Regiments from France.
- the Field Ambulances and Mobile Veterinary Sections merged with their Indian counterparts.
- the Essex Battery, RHA and ammunition column joined with 7th Mounted Brigade.
- Other divisional elements were raised for the new division.

=== 5th Cavalry Division ===
On 22 July 1918, the 2nd Mounted Division was renumbered as the 5th Cavalry Division and the brigades as the 13th, 14th and 15th (Imperial Service) Cavalry Brigades. The sub units (Signal Troops, Combined Cavalry Field Ambulances and Mobile Veterinary Sections) were renumbered on the same date.

Order of Battle, September 1918
13th Cavalry Brigade 1/1st Royal Gloucestershire Hussars; 9th Hodson's Horse; 18th King George's Own Lancers; 19th Machine Gun Squadron; 13th Cavalry Brigade Signal Troop; 13th Combined Cavalry Field Ambulance, RAMC; 13th Mobile Veterinary Section	14th Cavalry Brigade 1/1st Sherwood Rangers Yeomanry; 20th Deccan Horse; 34th Prince Albert Victor's Own Poona Horse; 20th Machine Gun Squadron; 14th Cavalry Brigade Signal Troop; 14th Combined Cavalry Field Ambulance, RAMC; 14th Mobile Veterinary Section	15th (Imperial Service) Cavalry Brigade Mysore Lancers; 1st Hyderabad Lancers; 1st Jodhpur Lancers; 15th I.S. Machine Gun Squadron; 15th Kathiawar Signal Troop; 15th I.S. Cavalry Field Ambulance; 15th I.S. Mobile Veterinary Section
Artillery Essex Battery, RHA; Nottinghamshire Battery, RHA (Note: Nottinghamshire, RHA was attached from Australian Mounted Division from September to October 1918.); Ammunition Column	Divisional Troops 5th Field Squadron, RE (Note: 7th Field Squadron, RE was renumbered as 5th Field Squadron, RE.); 5th Cavalry Division Signal Squadron	5th Cavalry Division Train 1044th Company ASC; 1103rd Company ASC; 1104th Company ASC; 1105th Company ASC

== Battles ==
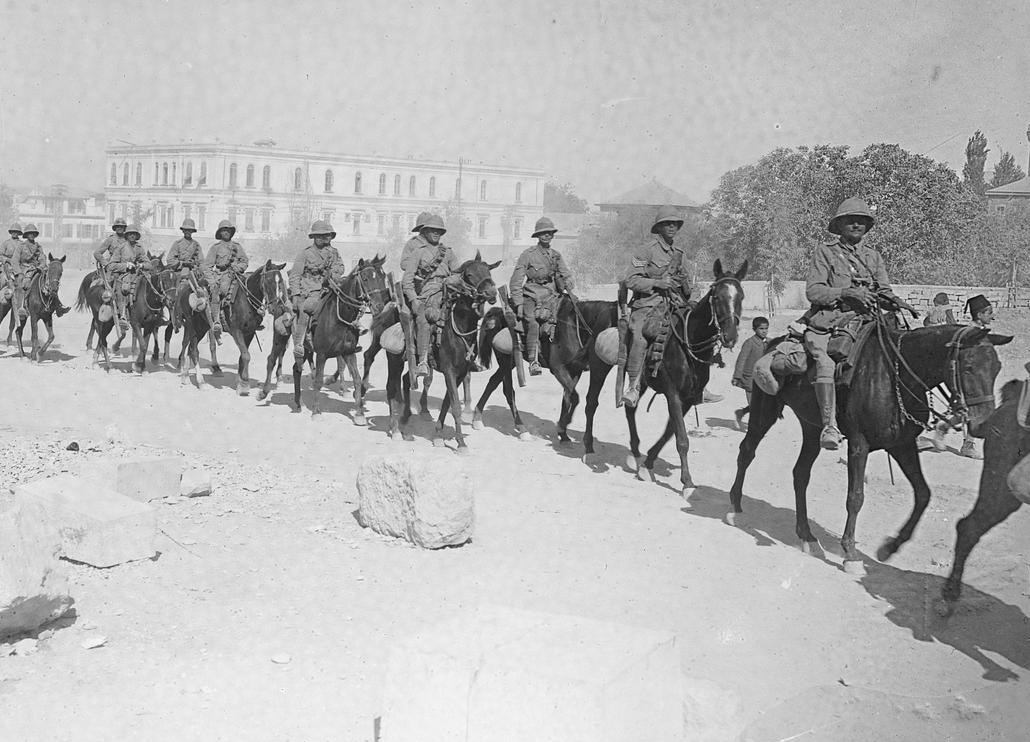
Gloucester Yeomanry march through Damascus on 2 October 1918

The 2nd Mounted / 5th Cavalry Division served with the Desert Mounted Corps for the rest of the war, taking part in the Second Transjordan Raid (30 April to 4 May 1918, 15th I.S. Brigade only), Affair of Abu Tellul (14 July), and the Final Offensive including the Battle of Megiddo (19 – 25 September), Capture of Haifa (23 September, 15th I.S. Brigade only) and Damascus (1 October), Affair of Haritan (26 October, 15th I.S. Brigade only) and Occupation of Aleppo (26 October).

The division remained in Palestine on occupation duties after the end of the war. However, demobilization began immediately and most of the British war time units had left by the middle of 1919. 14th Cavalry Brigade was broken up in September 1919, and the 15th (I.S.) Cavalry Brigade in January 1920. The division (and 13th Cavalry Brigade) was finally broken up in April 1920.

== See also ==
- 4th Cavalry Division (British Indian Army) formed at the same time in a similar manner.
- List of Indian divisions in World War I

== Bibliography ==
- Becke, Archibald F. (1936). Order of Battle of Divisions Part 2A. The Territorial Force Mounted Divisions and the 1st-Line Territorial Force Divisions (42–56). London: HMSO. OCLC 4405016.
- James, Brigadier E.A. (1978). British Regiments 1914–18. London: Samson Books. ISBN 0-906304-03-2.
- Perry, F.W. (1992). Order of Battle of Divisions Part 5A. The Divisions of Australia, Canada and New Zealand and those in East Africa. Newport: Ray Westlake Military Books. ISBN 1-871167-25-6.
- Perry, F.W. (1993). Order of Battle of Divisions Part 5B. Indian Army Divisions. Newport: Ray Westlake Military Books. ISBN 1-871167-23-X.
