= Haritan =

Haritan حريتان
- Town
- Location within Syria
- Coordinates: 36.287032°N 37.08332°E
- Country: Syria
- Governorate: Aleppo
- District: Mount Simeon
- Subdistrict: Haritan

Population (2004 census)
  - Total: 12,937
- Time zone: UTC+3 (AST)

Huraytan is the administrative center of Huraytan Nahiyah of the Jabal Sem‘ān District.

Haritan (Arabic: حريتان, romanized: Ḥuraytān, also spelled Huraytan or Hreitan) is a town in northern Syria, administratively part of the Mount Simeon District of the Aleppo Governorate, just northwest of Aleppo. Nearby localities include Ratyan, Bayanoun and Mayer to the north, Anadan, Yaqid al-Adas to the west, Kafr Hamrah to the south and Shaykh Najjar to the east.

According to the Syria Central Bureau of Statistics (CBS), Huraytan had a population of 12,937 in the 2004 census.

== See also ==
- Charge at Haritan
- Pursuit to Haritan
