= Charge at Kiswe =

First World War battle (September 1918)

Coordinates: 33°21′N 36°14′E

- Part of the Middle Eastern theatre of World War I
Date	30 September 1918
Location	near Kiswe in the Hauran area, about 9 miles (14 km) south of Damascus on the Pilgrims' Road from Deraa
Result	British victory

Belligerents
British Empire: India; Arab Revolt	Ottoman Empire; German Empire

Commanders and leaders
(United Kingdom) Edmund Allenby (Australia) Harry Chauvel (United Kingdom) Henry John Macandrew	(German Empire) Otto Liman von Sanders (Ottoman Empire) Mustafa Kemal Pasha (Ottoman Empire) Jevad Pasha (Ottoman Empire) Ismet Pasha

Units involved
5th Cavalry Division; Desert Mounted Corps	remnants of the Tiberias Group a portion of the 24th, 26th and 53rd Divisions and the 3rd Cavalry Division assigned to the defence of Damascus; Fourth Army Army Troops/rearguard from Yildirim Army Group

Casualties and losses
5 killed and 4 wounded	594 prisoners

The Charge at Kiswe took place on 30 September 1918 about 9 miles (14 km) south of Damascus, during the pursuit by Desert Mounted Corps following the decisive Egyptian Expeditionary Force victory at the Battle of Megiddo, the Battle of Jisr Benat Yakub and the Charge at Kaukab during the Sinai and Palestine Campaign in World War I. As Desert Mounted Corps rode along the main road from Nablus, units of the 14th Cavalry Brigade, 5th Cavalry Division, were ordered to charge a rearguard north of Kiswe, protecting columns of the Ottoman Fourth Army, retreating towards Damascus.

Following the victories at the Battle of Sharon and Battle of Nablus during the Battle of Megiddo, remnants of the Yildirim Army Group's Fourth Army retreated from Amman along the Pilgrim's Road, via Deraa (captured by Arab forces), while the Seventh and Eighth Armies retreated in columns towards Damascus from the Judean Hills. Rearguards established at Samakh, at Tiberias and at Jisr Benat Yakub were all captured by the Australian Mounted Division with the 5th Cavalry Division in reserve. On the way to Deraa from the Jordan River, the rearguard at Irbid was attacked by the 4th Cavalry Division.

A portion of the surviving German and Ottoman garrisons from Samakh and Tiberias, (formed from remnants of the Seventh and Eighth Armies) which had withdrawn from Jisr Benat Yakub and deployments from the Fourth Army, entrenched themselves on the high ground of the El Jebel el Aswad to protect the columns of retreating Fourth Army on the Pilgrims' Road, which had outrun the pursuit by the 4th Cavalry Division. The charge by the 14th Cavalry Brigade (less the Sherwood Rangers Yeomanry), resulted in the capture of part of the rearguard and caused the remnant Fourth Army column to split in two, in disorder.

== Background ==
The pursuit to Damascus began on 26 September when the 4th Cavalry Division advanced east from the Jordan River, via Irbid to Deraa which was captured by Sherifial forces on 27 September. Their pursuit continued with Feisal's Sherifial Force covering the cavalry division's right flank, north to Damascus 140 miles (230 km) away. The Australian Mounted Division with the 5th Cavalry Division in reserve, began their 90 miles (140 km) pursuit to Damascus on 27 September, around the northern end of the Sea of Galilee, also known as Lake Tiberias, via Jisr Benat Yakub and Kuneitra. (Note: These advances have been characterised as a "race for Damascus". [Gullett 1919 pp. 39–40] See also Falls 1930 Vol. 2 p. 567)

=== Liman von Sanders and Yildirim Army Group withdraws ===
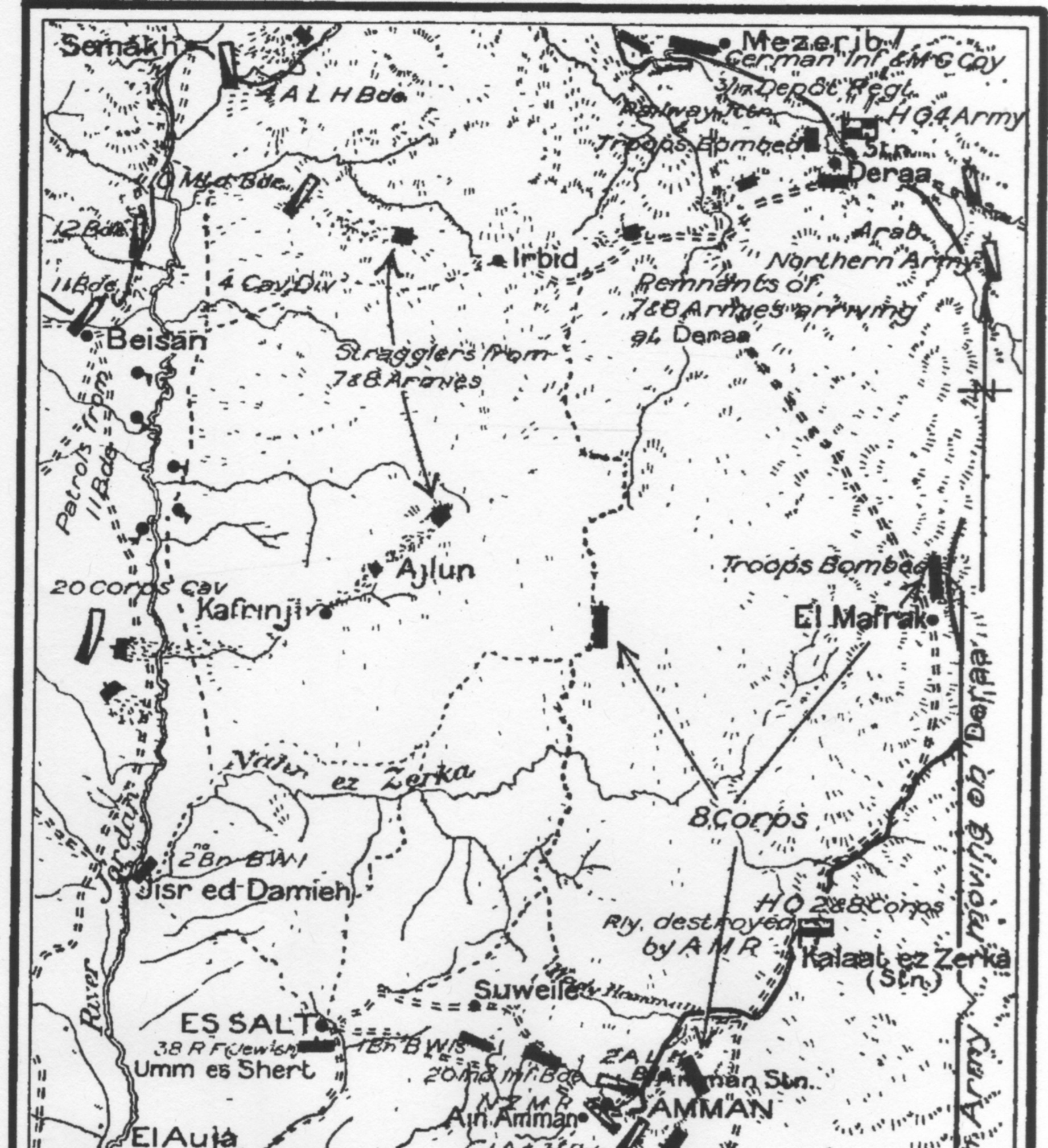
Gullett's Map 43 Detail shows positions of the retreating remnants of the Yildirim Army Group, Beisan, Irbid and Deraa with the Jordan River on the left and the Pilgrims' Road on right

By 26 September the Fourth Army's Amman garrison (less the rearguard captured at Amman) had not been "heavily engaged," and "was still intact as a fighting force even though it was in rapid retreat" northwards towards Damascus, along the Hejaz railway and Pilgrims Road, some miles to the east of the Jordan River.

Between 6,000 and 7,000 German and Ottoman soldiers remaining from the Ottoman Fourth, Seventh and Eighth Armies of Yildirim Army Group, had managed to retreat via Tiberias or Deraa, before these places were captured on 25 and 27 September, respectively.

The retreating columns which moved via Deraa were at or north of Muzeirib on their way to Damascus by 27 September. When Mustafa Kemal Pasha, commander of the Seventh Army arrived at Kiswe, with his army's leading troops on 29 September, Liman von Sanders ordered him to continue on north of Damascus to Rayak.

By the morning of 30 September, the leading column of the remnant Fourth Army consisting of an Ottoman cavalry division and some infantry, was approaching Kiswe 9 miles (14 km) south of Damascus, pursued by the Egyptian Expeditionary Force's 4th Cavalry Division 30 miles (48 km) behind.

=== 5th Cavalry Division ===
During the cavalry phase of the Battle of Sharon the 5th Cavalry Division had captured Nazareth and Haifa. The division had followed the Australian Mounted Division's pursuit of the remnant Yildirim Army Group along the Jerusalem to Damascus road, when it was ordered to move to cut the road from Deraa to the south of Damascus.

== Prelude ==
As the vanguard of the 5th Cavalry Division reached Sa'sa at 08:30 on 30 September 1918, Major General Henry John Macandrew, commanding the division, was ordered by Lieutenant General Harry Chauvel the commander of the Desert Mounted Corps, to "intercept a force of 2,000 Turks reported by an aeroplane to be retiring towards Damascus by the Pilgrims' Road." At this point, the road from Kuneitra to Damascus along which the Australian Mounted and the 5th Cavalry Divisions were advancing, was only 9 miles (14 km) from the Pilgrims' Road from Deraa; the two roads converging as they approached Damascus. The "5th Cavalry Division turned eastwards, to intercept and destroy the remnants of the Turkish Fourth Army before it reached Damascus," with the Essex Battery Royal Horse Artillery (RHA) following in support.

=== Defence of Damascus ===
Otto Liman von Sanders commander of Yildirim Army Group ordered the 24th, 26th and 53rd Infantry Divisions, XX Corps Seventh Army and the 3rd Cavalry Division, Army Troops Fourth Army, under the command of Colonel Ismet Bey (commander of the III Corps Seventh Army) to defend Damascus, while the remaining Ottoman formations were ordered to retreat northwards. The Tiberias Group commanded by Jemal Pasha (commander of the Fourth Army) was also ordered to defend Damascus.

== Battle ==
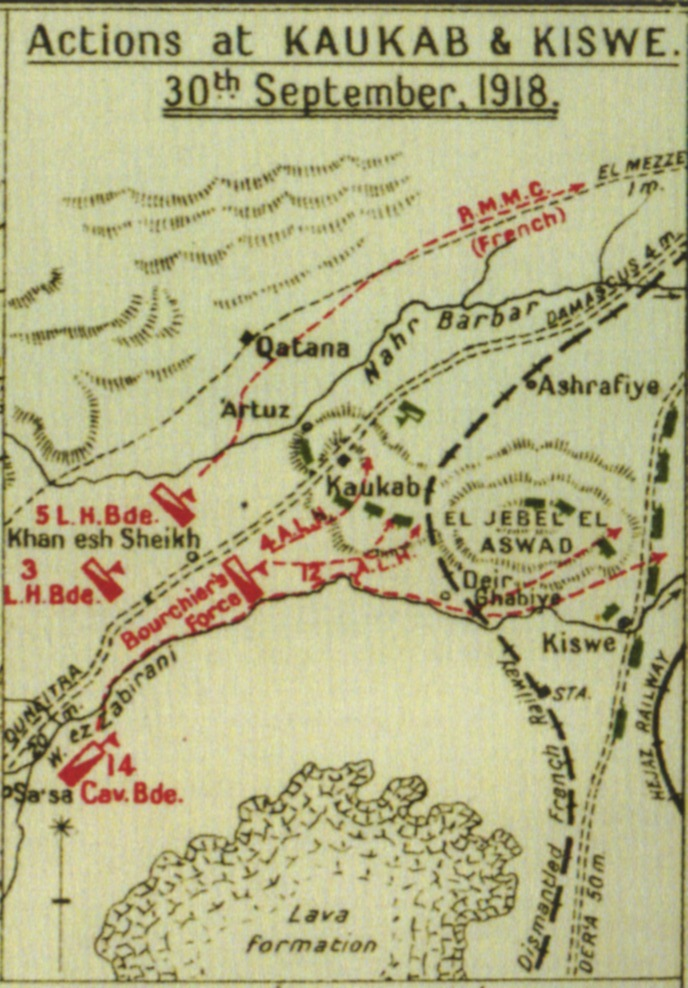
Falls Sketch Map 39 detail Actions at Kaukab and Kiswe

As the 5th Cavalry Division's vanguard 14th Cavalry Brigade approached Kiswe and the Pilgrims Road along the left bank of the Wadi ez Zabirani, with the hills of El Jebel el Aswad on their left, patrols reported the village "strongly held." They reported "the enemy was established also on the hills of El Jebel el Aswad to the north and the road was packed with troops and transport."

At Kiswe a rearguard of 2,000 Ottoman soldiers armed with machine guns defended the town, stopping the advance by the 20th Deccan Horse and the 34th Poona Horse (14th Cavalry Brigade). (Note: The third brigade of the 14th Cavalry Brigade, the 1/1st Sherwood Rangers Yeomanry remained at Haifa on the lines of communication. [Falls 1930 Vol. 2 p. 574]) Macandrews ordered them to bypass Kiswe and at noon concentrated his force for the attack on another enemy rearguard 3 miles (4.8 km) to the north, leaving a squadron of Deccan Horse near Kiswe.

Two squadrons of the 20th Deccan Horse dismounted to attack and capture the nearest point on the El Jebel el Aswad hills above the road and established themselves on the position overlooking the road.

The remainder of the 14th Cavalry Brigade rode .5 miles (0.80 km) further on towards Damascus, to a narrow pass strongly defended on both sides, through which a closely packed mixed column "six or eight abreast" marched towards Damascus. Large numbers of retreating Ottoman soldiers, could also be seen further north, approaching Damascus.

The 34th Poona Horse came into contact with a rearguard in a "large stone sangar." A squadron of the 34th Poona Horse charged the sangar mounted, supported by artillery fire from the Essex Battery RHA. The rearguard immediately "broke and fled at sight of the charge," while the charge continued into the retreating enemy column, splitting it in two; many attempting to escape eastwards away from the road. "In the neighbouring gardens 40 officers and 150 men, the headquarters and all that remained of one regiment of the 3rd Cavalry Division were rounded up and captured."

The 14th Brigade bivouacked on the El Jebel el Aswad ridge, having captured a total of 594 prisoners but suffering five killed and four wounded.

During the day the retreating Fourth Army columns were bombed by five Australian aircraft south of Kiswe on the Wady Zabirani leaving about 4,000 infantry and cavalry scattered on the north bank of the wadi near El Jebel el Aswad.

== Aftermath ==
At 14:00 a troop of the 1/1st Gloucester Hussars, 13th Cavalry Brigade with a Hotchkiss rifle section reconnoitred the Ottoman wireless station at Qadem; both the railway and wireless were found to be burning; they captured some Ottoman soldiers before "entering the close country west of Qadem" when they charged and killed a number before withdrawing back to the headquarters of the Australian Mounted Division.

At 14:30 Macandrew ordered the 13th Cavalry Brigade consisting of the Gloucester Hussars, 9th Hodson's Horse and 18th Lancers, to advance from Kaukab to Kiswe but was withdrawn two hours later back to garrison Kaukab. Meanwhile, the brigade's vanguard; one squadron of 9th Hodson's Horse captured 700 prisoners which were sent to the rear escorted by two troops. The remainder of the squadron then pursued and attempted to capture a retreating column of about 1,500 .75 miles (1.21 km) east of the Pilgrims Road. The attack ceased without support from their brigade.

=== Position of Desert Mounted Corps ===
By midnight on 30 September/1 October, the Australian Mounted Division was at El Mezze 2 miles (3.2 km) to the west of Damascus.

The 14th Cavalry Brigade, held "the last ridge south of the city, the others [brigades of the 5th Cavalry Division were] further back near Kaukab." The 4th Cavalry Division and an Arab force were, by the evening of 30 September in action against the remnant Fourth Army around Khan Deinun. The 4th Cavalry Division was also reported at Zeraqiye 34 miles (55 km) from Damascus on the Pilgrims' Road, only the 11th Cavalry Brigade being at Khan Deinun with Arab forces north east of Ashrafiye. An Arab force was reported to be camped at Kiswe.

Chauvel ordered the 5th Cavalry Division to the east of Damascus while the 4th Cavalry Division continued their advance from the south.
