= Capture of Jisr ed Damieh =

1918 British victory in Jordan valley

- Part of the Middle Eastern theatre of World War I
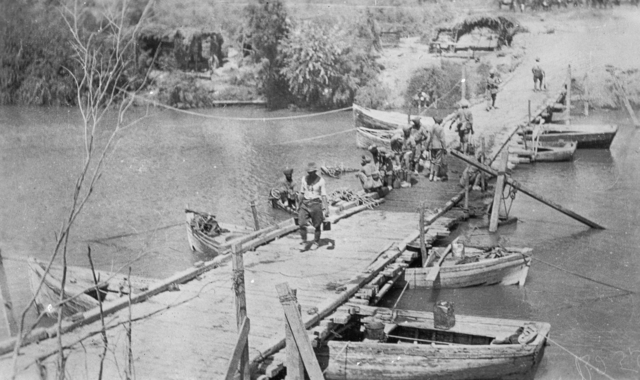
- British pontoon bridge at Jisr ed Damieh
| Date | 22 September 1918 |
| Location | The bridge at Jisr ed Damieh across the Jordan River 32°6′10″N 35°32′7″E |
| Result | British victory |

Belligerents
| British Empire | Ottoman Empire; German Empire |

Commanders and leaders
| (United Kingdom of Great Britain and Ireland) Edmund Allenby (New Zealand) Edward Chaytor (New Zealand) Wiliam Meldrum | (German Empire) Otto Liman von Sanders (Ottoman Empire) Mustafa Kemal Pasha (Ottoman Empire) Mohammed Jemal Pasha |

Units involved
| Meldrum's Force; New Zealand Mounted Rifles Brigade mounted sections of the 1st and 2nd Battalions British West Indies Regiment; 29th Indian Mountain Battery; Inverness-shire Battery Royal Horse Artillery (all detached from Chaytor's Force) | Seventh Army; Fourth Army |

The Capture of Jisr ed Damieh took place on 22 September 1918 during the Third Transjordan attack of the Battle of Nablus which, along with the main Battle of Sharon formed the Battle of Megiddo fought during the Sinai and Palestine Campaign of the First World War. Units of Chaytor's Force under the commanded by Brigadier-General William Meldrum, and known as "Meldrum's Force", attacked and captured the bridge. This successful attack cut the most direct line of retreat from the Judean Hills for the Seventh and remnants of the Eighth Armies, while units from these two armies were moving towards, and crossing the Jisr ed Damieh bridge over the Jordan River. This victory by Meldrum's Force opened the way for Chaytor's Force to advance along the main Nablus to Es Salt road to capture Es Salt and to continue on to the victory at the Second Battle of Amman.

The main attack by the Egyptian Expeditionary Force (EEF), commanded by General Edmund Allenby, during the battle of Sharon focused on the Mediterranean coastal sector and western Judean Hills, with a simultaneous attack by the XXI Corps on the Ottoman Eighth Army and breakthrough by the Desert Mounted Corps. Meanwhile, in the Nablus battle area in the Judean Hills, on the right flank of the main attack, the XX Corps faced the Ottoman Seventh Army, while Chaytor's Force held the extreme right flank in the Jordan Valley, against the Ottoman Fourth Army. Once it became apparent that the initial attacks and subsequent cavalry breakthrough during the Battle of Tulkarm, Battle of Tabsor and Capture of Afulah and Beisan were succeeding, the XX Corps Battle of Nablus began in the Judean Hills towards Nablus. Also Chaytor's Force began their attacks northwards in the Jordan Valley, then crossed the Jordan River to capture Es Salt and Amman. This advance resulted in the capture of about half of the Fourth Army at Amman and Ziza and many miles of territory. The remnants of the Fourth Army retreated in disarray towards Damascus where most were captured.

== Background ==
=== Front lines ===
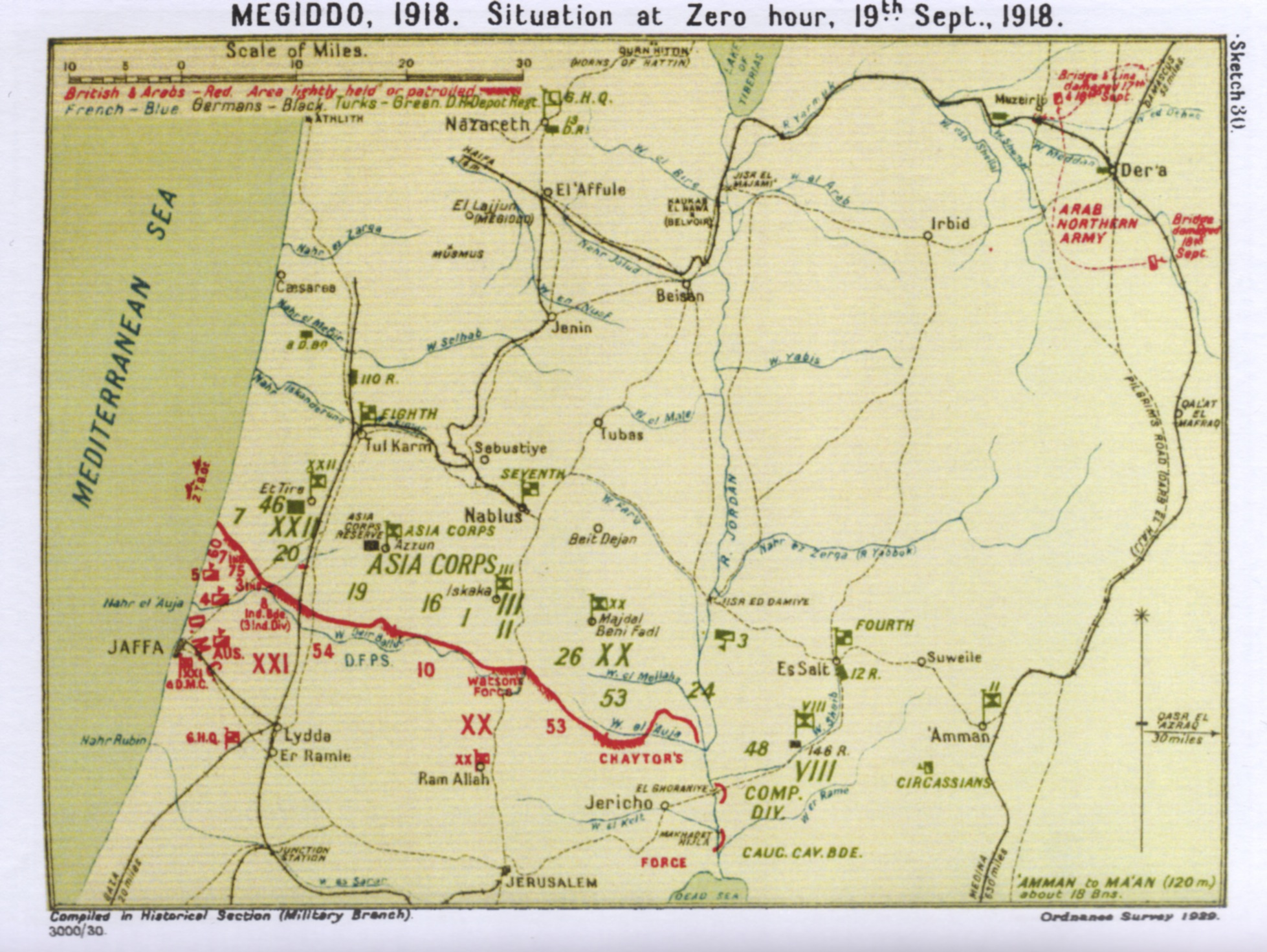
Falls Sketch Map 30 Situation at Zero hour 19 September

The front line held by the Egyptian Expeditionary Force commanded by General Edmund Allenby prior to the Battle of Megiddo on 19 September began at a point on the Mediterranean coast about 12 miles (19 km) north of Jaffa, to the north of Arsuf, ran about 15 miles (24 km) south east across the Plain of Sharon, then east over the Judean Hills for about another 15 miles (24 km), then continuing on for about 18 miles (29 km) to the Dead Sea. From the Mediterranean coast, the front line rose from sea level to a height of 1,500–2,000 feet (460–610 m) in the Judean Hills before falling to 1,000 feet (300 m) below sea-level in the Jordan Valley.

The Ottoman front line, which had been strengthened after the Second Transjordan attack, began in the south with strongly wired entrenchments with advanced posts extending from the foothills opposite the ford across the Jordan River at Makhadet Hijla to about 4 miles (6.4 km) north of the Jericho to Es Salt road, cut at the Ghorianyeh Bridge, in the vicinity of Shunet Nimrin. A wired line of redoubts and trenches facing south ran from 8,000 yards (7,300 m) north of Shunet Nimrin, across the Jordan Valley to the river, 1,000 yards (910 m) south of the Umm esh Shert ford. The line continued as a series of individual wired redoubts that dominated open ground, then as a series of trenches and redoubts along the northern or left bank of the Wadi Mellaha. These were followed by strongly wired sangars and posts which extended into the Judean Hills to Bakr Ridge to the west of the salient at El Musallabe held by the Egyptian Expeditionary Force. The Ottoman front line was supported by entrenched positions on Red Hill beside the Jordan River, which was also the site of their main artillery observation point.

=== Chaytor's Force deployment ===
Chaytor's Force held the right flank from their junction with the XX Corps in the Judean Hills 8 miles (13 km) north west of Jericho, across the Jordan Valley, and then southwards through the Ghoraniye and Auja bridgeheads to the Dead Sea. This area garrisoned by Chaytor's Force was overlooked by well sighted Ottoman long range guns.

Meldrum's Force commanded by Brigadier General William Meldrum, was formed by the New Zealand Mounted Rifles Brigade, 1st Machine Gun squadron, mounted sections of the 1st and 2nd Battalions, British West Indies Regiment, the 29th Indian Mountain Battery, and the Inverness-shire Battery Royal Horse Artillery was formed on 21 September 1918 for the attack on Jisr ed Damieh.

=== Yildirim Army Group retreat ===
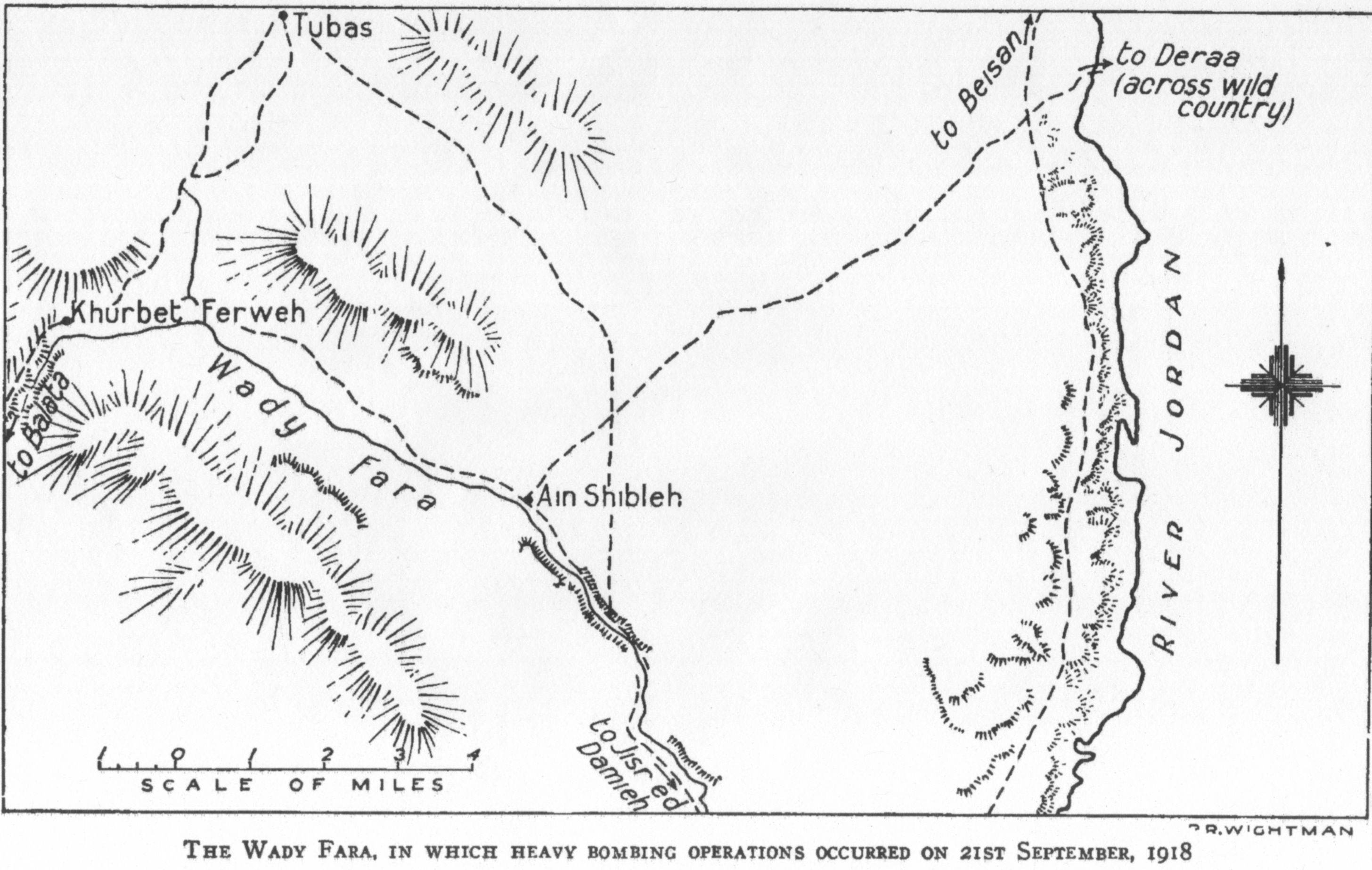
Cutlack Map 8 shows the section of the Wady Fara bombed during 21 September 1918

The Yildirim Army Group had consisted of 40,598 front line infantrymen armed with 19,819 rifles, 273 light machine guns and 696 heavy machine guns in August 1918. (Note: The only available German and Ottoman sources are Liman von Sanders' memoir and the Asia Corps' war diary. Ottoman army and corps records seem to have disappeared during their retreat. [Falls 1930 Vol. 2 pp. 494–5]) The infantry had been organised into twelve divisions and deployed along the 90 kilometres (56 mi) of front line from the Mediterranean to the Dead Sea: the Eighth Army from the coast into the Judean Hills, the Seventh Army in the Judean Hills and towards the Jordan, with the Fourth Army east of the Jordan River.

By early afternoon of 21 September, organised Yildirim Army Group resistance in the Judean Hills had ceased, most of the Ottoman Eighth Army had surrendered while the Seventh Army was retreating east down the Wadi el Fara road hoping to cross the Jordan River by the bridge at Jisr ed Damieh.

The Seventh Army was in retreat down the Wadi el Fara road towards the Jordan River after being forced to abandon its guns and transports. This large column of Ottoman soldiers was seen about 8 miles (13 km) north of Nablus moving down the road towards Beisan and was heavily bombed and machine gunned by British and Australian aircraft. When the defile became blocked, the Ottoman forces were subjected to four hours of sustained attack, which destroyed at least 90 guns, 50 motor lorries and more than 1,000 other vehicles. The remnants of the Army then turned north at 'Ain Shible, still moving towards Beisan, except for the Ottoman 53rd Division which managed to escape before the defile was blocked but were later captured by Chaytor's Force in the Jordan Valley on 22 September.

== Prelude ==
Falls Map 33 Megiddo Situation at 21:00 21 September 1918

Chaytor ordered Meldrum to cut the Wadi el Fara road from Nablus west of the Jordan River, occupy the headquarters of the Ottoman 53rd Division at El Makhruk, and capture the Jisr ed Damieh bridge over the Jordan River on the Nablus to Es Salt road.

Meldrum's Force left Kh Fusail at midnight on 22 September with the Auckland Mounted Rifles Regiment as vanguard. They were followed at 01:30 by the 1st Battalion British West Indies Regiment, which had just arrived at Kh Fasail. The battalion was ordered to dump their kits and blankets and march to Jisr ed Damieh. They arrived south of Ain Jozele, at 05:00.

The Auckland and Wellington Mounted Rifle Regiments advanced along the Roman road, across a narrow plain hemmed in by the Judean Hills to the west and exposed to Ottoman artillery firing from the eastern side of the river. The Auckland Mounted Rifle Regiment's objective was to capture the Jisr ed Damieh bridge from the north east, while the Wellington Mounted Rifle Regiment's objectives were to make a frontal attack on El Makhruk, capture the headquarters of the Ottoman 53rd Division, and cut the Nablus road.

The Wellington Mounted Rifles Regiment, with a section from the New Zealand Machine Gun Squadron attached, reached the Nablus to Jisr ed Damieh road early on the morning of 22 September. They had captured Abd el Kadyr and El Makhruk, located further up the Wadi el Fara road by 07:00, after a "sharp fight". Also captured were 600 prisoners, the commander of the Ottoman 53rd Division and his staff, and a great deal of war material in the division's dump. (Note: This was the second time that a commander of the Ottoman 53rd Division had been captured by the New Zealanders. The first occurred at Gaza in March 1917. [Falls 1930 Vol. 2 p. 551] [Hill 1978 p. 173])

The Auckland Mounted Rifles Regiment meanwhile arrived at Ain Jozele, 1 mile (1.6 km) north west of the Jisr ed Damieh bridge, just after an Ottoman column had passed which was then in the process of crossing the Jordan River by the bridge.

== Battle ==
Detail of Falls Sketch Map No. 24 of the region, including Jericho, Wadi Nueiame, Wadi el Auja, Wadi el Mellaha, El Musallabe, Bakr Ridge, El Baghalat, Kh Fasail, Meteil edn Dhib, El Musetter, and the fords from El Ghoraniye, to Umm esh Shert, Mafid Jozele and the Jisr ed Damieh bridge with the entrenched Shunet Nimrin position to the east overlooked by El Haud to the north east

The Auckland and Canterbury Mounted Rifles Regiments, supported by the 1st Battalion, British West Indies Regiment, advanced to attack the Ottoman garrison holding the Jisr ed Damieh bridge. During determined fighting by both sides a "hot fight" occurred. The attackers eventually forced the defenders to retreat in disorder, and the bridge was captured intact.

The Auckland Mounted Rifles Regiment attacked the strongly defended bridge under cover of darkness in the pre-dawn, while a large Ottoman column of retreating soldiers was in close proximity. The mounted riflemen commanded by Colonel McCarroll were pushed back about 100 yards (91 m) by a strong counter-attack from the bridgehead. Meldrum sent the 1st Squadron, Canterbury Mounted Rifles Regiment and one company of the 1st Battalion, British West Indies Regiment to reinforce the Auckland Mounted Rifles Regiment. (Note: The squadron is referred to as the 1st (Canterbury Yeomanry Cavalry) Squadron, Canterbury Regiment.["Canterbury Mounted Rifles Regiment". New Zealand History.]) The Ottoman defenders had attempted to turn the Auckland Mounted Rifle Regiment's right flank, but the mounted riflemen fought their way to a position overlooking the Jisr ed Damieh, across the Wadi el Fara road.

The first large column of about 1,200 Ottoman soldiers had finished crossing the bridge, and now threatened to cut off Meldrum's Force. This Ottoman force moved to the east of Red Hill towards Mafid Jozele, while another Ottoman force attacked Talaat Amrah, which was defended by units of the 2nd Battalion, British West Indies Regiment. A second column of about 500 Ottoman Seventh Army soldiers with two mountain guns was seen at 07:00 advancing down the Wadi el Fara road from Nablus towards the Jisr ed Damieh bridge. Another two battalions of retreating Ottoman infantry were only 3–4 miles (4.8–6.4 km) away, representing a further threat as they moved along the Wadi el Fara road from the direction of Nablus, towards the bridge.

Meldrum responded to the threat from the approaching columns on the Wadi el Fara road by reinforcing the Wellington Mounted Rifles Regiment with the 10th Squadron, Canterbury Mounted Rifles Regiment. (Note: 10th (Nelson) Squadron, Canterbury Mounted Rifles Regiment. ["Canterbury Mounted Rifles Regiment". New Zealand History.]) These mounted riflemen attacked the column of 500 Ottoman troops on the Wadi el Fara road, and forced them back into the hills where they remained for the rest of the day, "intermittently shell[ing] the Wellington Regiment."

The 1st Light Horse Brigade, with the Inverness-shire Battery, had joined the 2nd Battalion British West Indies Regiment at Kh. Fusail by 08:15 on 22 September. This force, under the command of Brigadier General Charles Frederick Cox, was ordered by Chaytor to clear the broken ground on the western bank of the Mafid Jozele ford. One regiment of the 2nd Light Horse Brigade was to move towards Madaba to protect the exposed flank of Meldrum's Force attacking Jisr ed Damieh bridge.

The Auckland Mounted Rifles Regiment, a squadron from the Canterbury Mounted Rifles Regiment, and a company from the 1st Battalion British West Indies Regiment began a general advance on the strongly held Jisr ed Damieh bridge at 10:50. Under cover of two artillery batteries and machine guns, they carried out a bayonet charge against the Ottoman garrison holding the bridge. They broke through the Ottoman position, after hand-to-hand fighting, and captured the bridge. Meldrum's machine guns inflicted many casualties to the escaping survivors. The 11th Squadron or a troop of the Auckland Mounted Rifles Regiment crossed the bridge mounted, pursued the Ottoman's for some distance, and captured many prisoners. (Note: 11th (North Auckland) Squadron. ["Auckland Mounted Rifles Regiment". New Zealand History.]) One squadron of Canterbury Mounted Rifles Regiment then crossed on the eastern bank of the Jordan River, to clear the roads.

Meldrum's Force captured 786 prisoners, six guns, including two Honourable Artillery Company 18-pounders that had been captured from the 4th Light Horse Brigade during fighting on 1 May, nine machine guns, and 200 tons of ammunition and stores. During these operations and those of the preceding three days, Chaytor's Force suffered 72 battle casualties and 400 sick. All were evacuated by camels and motor ambulances to the divisional receiving station at Jericho.

According to a Royal Air Force report, only about 600 soldiers from the Seventh Army escaped across the Jordan River at Jisr ed Damieh, before the crossing was captured. The success of Meldrum's Force in capturing this important tactical point contributed to the success of the third Transjordan operations, as well as to the encirclement operations of the Battle of Megiddo, by cutting a main Ottoman line of retreat. The remaining 20 miles (32 km) gap north from Jisr ed Damieh to Beisan was closed on 24 September, when the 4th Cavalry Division, which had captured Afulah and Beisan advanced south from Beisan.

The New Zealanders held the Jisr ed Damieh bridgehead on the east bank, for the night of 22/23 September. One company of 1st Battalion British West Indies Regiment held a protective line to the south, and the Wellington Mounted Rifles Regiment held a line to the north and west.

== Aftermath ==
The EEF became aware of the retreat of the Fourth Army at 23:35 on 22/23 September, when orders were issued for an attack on Shunet Nimrin. On 23 September, Chaytor's Force crossed the Jordan River and climbed to the Plateau of Moab and Gilead on their way to capture Es Salt that the evening.
