= Chaytor's Force =

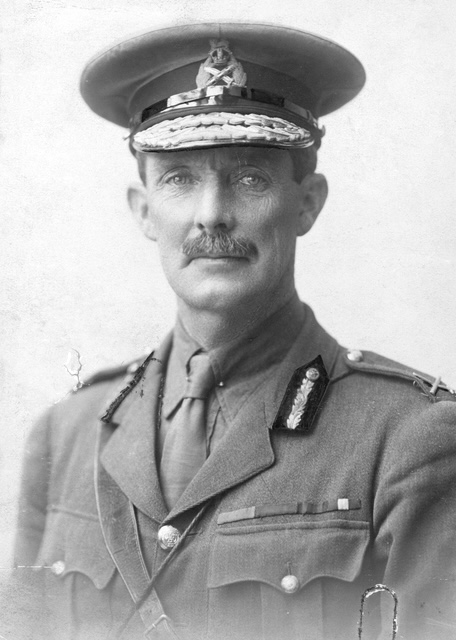
- Major General Sir Edward Chaytor
- Active: 13 August – 31 October 1918
- Country: British Empire
- Allegiance: British Crown
- Type: Mounted Infantry; Infantry; Artillery
- Size: Reinforced Division of 11,000
- Part of: Desert Mounted Corps; Egyptian Expeditionary Force
- Engagements: First World War: Battle of Nablus; Third Transjordan attack

Commanders
- Notable commanders: Edward Chaytor

Chaytor's Force (13 August – 31 October 1918) named after its commander, Major General Edward Chaytor, was a composite division-sized force which served in the British Egyptian Expeditionary Force during the Sinai and Palestine Campaign of the First World War. The force of 11,000 men, consisted of a division headquarters, three mounted and one infantry brigades, four independent infantry battalions and four artillery batteries and was detached from the Desert Mounted Corps for deception operations. (Note: Chaytor's Force was larger than a mounted but smaller than an infantry division, which had around 20,000 men. Jukes describes it as a small mobile force. Basil Liddle Hart described it as the "ANZAC Mounted Division, reinforced by a few infantry battalions". In An Outline History of the Great War its described as the "ANZAC Mounted Division, with a contingent of infantry equivalent to two brigades". Woodward in Hell in the Holy Land describes it as the "ANZAC Mounted Division, the 20th Indian Infantry Brigade and some other units". Paddy Griffith in The Great War calls it "a reinforced cavalry division", Bou describes it as "nearly equivalent to two divisions." The force had a ration strength of "8,000 British, 3,000 Indian, 500 Egyptian Camel Transport Corps on 30 September".)

Chaytor's Force was formed to deceive the Ottoman high command into thinking the whole Desert Mounted Corps was positioned on the British right flank. They created dummy camps, guns positions and horses. Mules were used to drag branches along tracks, making dust, imitating the movement of mounted troops. Each day infantry marched into the Jordan Valley, and was driven out by trucks by night, to suggest a buildup of troops. Later it was primary responsible for the defence of the Egyptian Expeditionary Force's right flank, from the northern end of the Dead Sea to a point 8 miles (13 km) north-west of Jericho where the force touched the XX Corps. Chaytor's Force faced the Turkish Fourth Army, until that army was forced to retreat as a consequence of the successes of the Battles of Sharon and Nablus.

== Operations ==
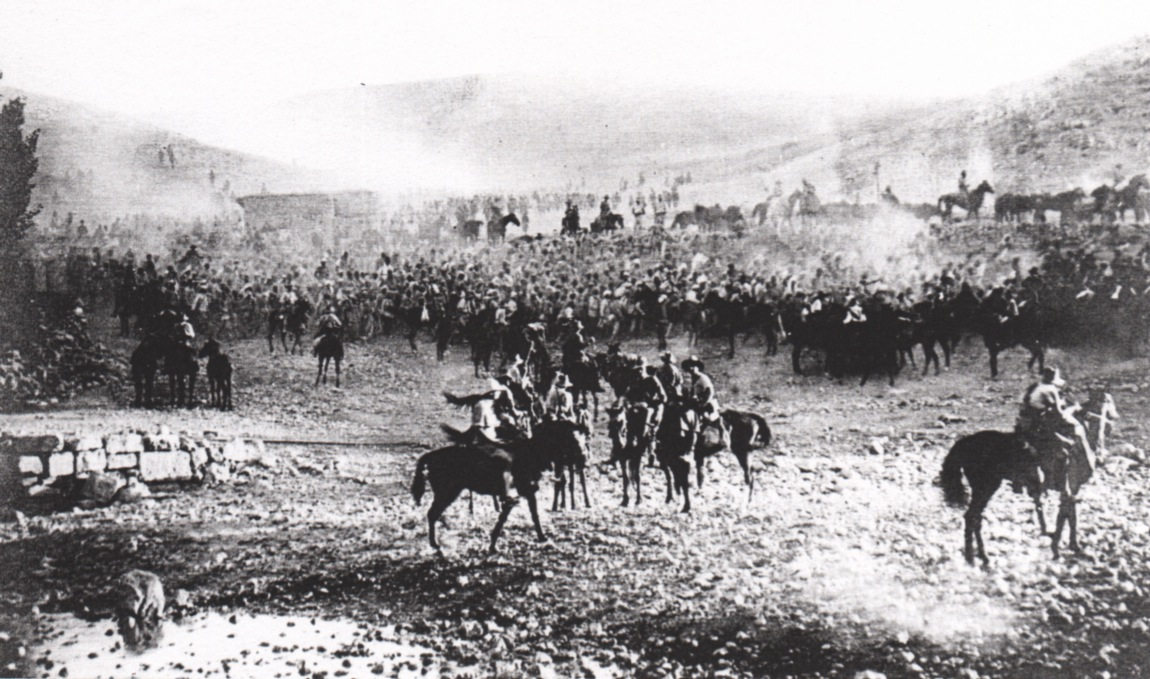
Prisoners taken by Chaytor's Force

Chaytor's orders from the GOC Edmund Allenby were to "be vigilant, and ready at any moment to take the offensive". By demonstration and pressure he was to "prevent the enemy withdrawing troops to reinforce other parts of the line or concentrate against the XX Corps; to use every endeavour to protect the right flank of the XX Corps when it advanced; and, if the Turks reduced their strength in the Jordan valley, he was to advance to the bridge at Jisr ed Damieh, and be ready to move east across the Jordan on Es Salt and Amman, where he was to co-operate with the Arabs".

Between 19 and 20 September while the main Battle of Sharon and attack by XX Corps developed, Chaytor's Force held their right and the Jordan Valley against the Fourth Army, while carrying out active demonstrations. The 2nd Battalion British West Indies Regiment's advances towards Bakr Ridge were consolidated and continued at dawn on 20 September while the 2nd Light Horse Brigade and Patiala Infantry advanced eastwards across the Jordan Valley towards Shunet Nimrin.

On 21 September when the retreat of the Fourth Army had begun, the main line of retreat for the Eighth and Seventh Armies in the Judean Hills east to the Jordan Valley was cut at Kh Fasail by the Auckland Mounted Rifles Regiment. They were joined by the remainder of the New Zealand Mounted Rifles Brigade for the attack on Jisr ed Damieh, the main bridge over the Jordan River being used by the retreating Ottoman columns.

On 22 September the headquarters of the Ottoman 53rd Division were captured at El Makhruk and the line of retreat along the Nablus road was cut. With the threat of being overwhelmed by large Ottoman forces withdrawing towards Jisr ed Damieh bridge, the New Zealand Mounted Rifles Brigade and a company of 1st Battalion British West Indies Regiment attacked the bridge with a squadron of Auckland mounted Rifles Regiment charging across the bridge to pursue and capture many prisoners.

The fords crossing the River Jordan at Umm esh Shert and Mafid Jozele were also captured on 22 September by the 2nd Battalion British West Indies Regiment with the 3rd Light Horse Regiment after the 38th Royal Fusiliers captured the Mellaha position in the Jordan Valley.

Chaytor's Force crossed the Jordan River on their advance to Es Salt on 23 September which was captured in the evening after capturing rearguards. Chaytor's Force advanced towards Amman which was attacked and captured on 25 September. At Ziza on 28 September Chaytor's Force captured the Fourth Army's Southern Force.

The first units from Chaytor's Force had crossed the Jordan River on 22 September and by 2 October had captured Amman, taken 10,332 prisoners of war, fifty-seven guns, 147 machine guns, eleven railway engines, 106 railway carriages or trucks, and 142 vehicles.

== Order of battle ==
Composition of Chaytor's Force in September 1918. All details from MacMunn and Falls (1996), app3, p. 673 unless indicated.

- Commander: Major-General Sir E. W. C. Chaytor
- Staff: Taken from the A and NZ Mounted Division
- ANZAC Mounted Division
  - 1st Light Horse Brigade (Brigadier-General C. F. Cox)
    - 1st Light Horse Regiment
    - 2nd Light Horse Regiment
    - 3rd Light Horse Regiment
  - 2nd Light Horse Brigade (Brigadier-General G. de L. Ryrie)
    - 5th Light Horse Regiment
    - 6th Light Horse Regiment
    - 7th Light Horse Regiment
  - New Zealand Mounted Rifles Brigade (Brigadier-General W. Meldrum)
    - Auckland Mounted Rifles Regiment
    - Canterbury Mounted Rifles Regiment
    - Wellington Mounted Rifles Regiment
  - 18th Brigade, Royal Horse Artillery (RHA)
    - Inverness-shire Battery RHA
    - Ayrshire Battery RHA
    - Somerset Battery RHA
- 20th Indian Brigade (Brigadier General E. R. B. Murray)
  - 110th Mahratta Light Infantry
  - Alwar Infantry (I.S.)
  - 4th Battalion, Gwalior Infantry (I.S.)
  - 1st Battalion, Patiala Infantry (I.S.) (Rajindra Sikhs)
  - 38th Battalion, Royal Fusiliers (Jewish Legion)
  - 39th Battalion, Royal Fusiliers (Jewish Legion)
  - 1st Battalion, British West Indies Regiment
  - 2nd Battalion, British West Indies Regiment
- From 10th Divisional Artillery
  - 75th Battery, Royal Field Artillery (RFA)
  - 195th Heavy Battery, Royal Garrison Artillery (RGA)
  - 29th Indian Mountain Battery
  - 32nd Indian Mountain Battery
  - No. 6 (Medium) Trench Mortar Battery

The following units were also attached to Chaytor's Force but are not included in the Official History order of battle:

- Detachment, No. 35 Army Troops Company, Royal Engineers
  - 26th Machine Gun Squadron
  - A/263rd Battery, RFA
  - Nos. 96, 102, 103 anti-aircraft sections, Royal Artillery
  - 2 Sections captured Ottoman 75 mm guns
  - 1 Section captured Ottoman 59 mm guns.

Also included was a transport echelon of 300 donkeys, seventeen tractors, thirty-four trucks, five ammunition lorries and fourteen supply lorries. The Desert Mounted Corps and the infantry XX and XXI Corps had by comparison, thirty and 120 ammunition and supply lorries for the mounted corps to sixty and 180 ammunition and supply lorries for the infantry corps.
