= Ghoraniyeh =

A WWI sketch of the Jordan Valley

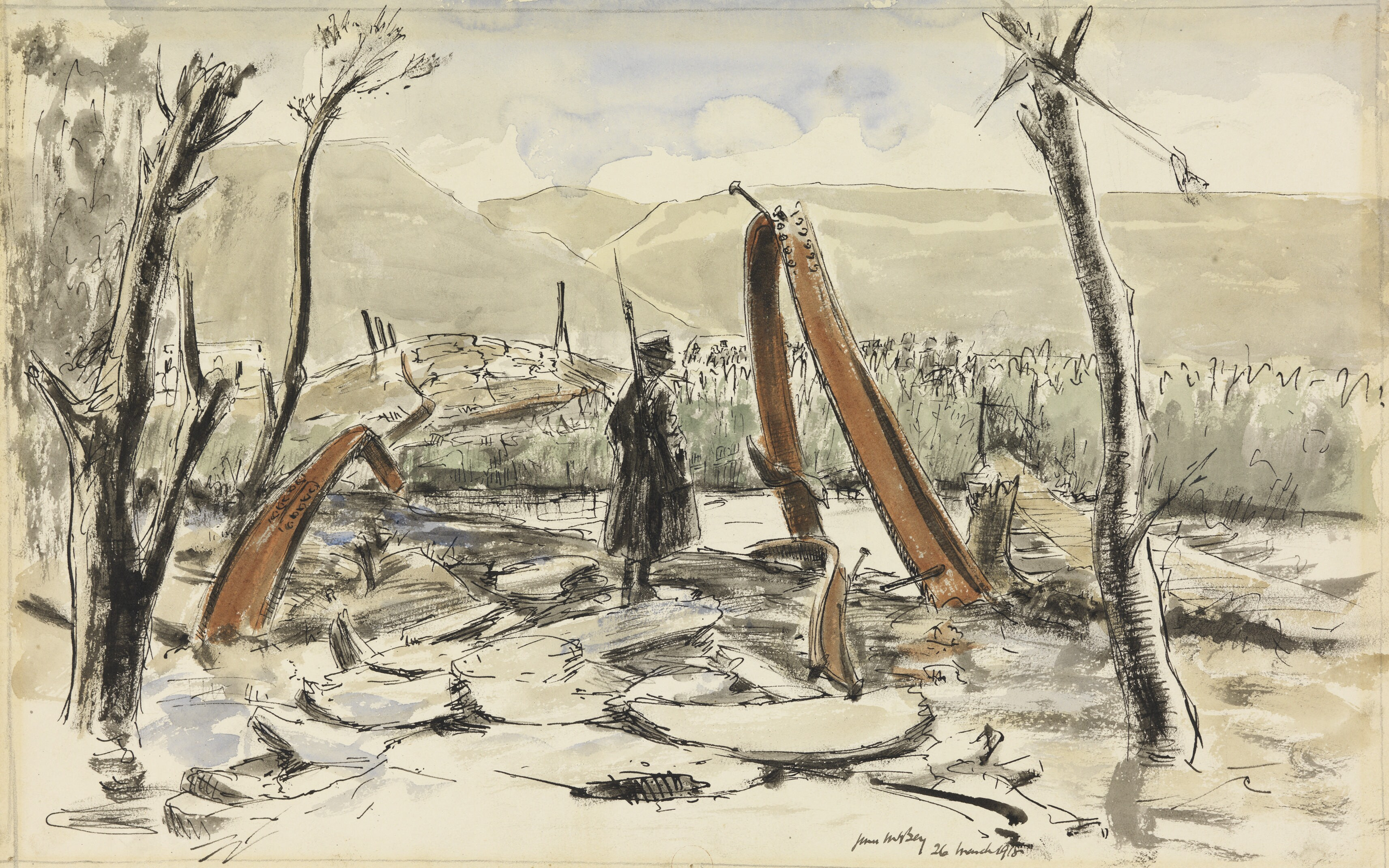
Ruins of the burnt bridge and a pontoon bridge; Ghoraniyeh WWI bridgehead; by James McBey (1918)

Ghoraniyeh or El Ghorahiyeh is a crossing (ford) by the Jordan River south of Wadi Nimrin on the left bank where it joins Wadi an Nuway'imah (Nuei'ameh, Nu'eima, etc.) on the right bank. During the Ottoman times there was a bridge, destroyed during World War I by the retreating Ottomans. During the war it was an important bridgehead.
